The following are notable people who were either born, raised or have lived for a significant period of time in the U.S. state of Texas.

Founders and early settlers of Texas

 Augustus Chapman Allen (1806–1864), founder of Houston
 Charlotte Baldwin Allen (1805–1895), financed founding of Houston, known as the "mother of Houston"
 John Kirby Allen (1810–1838), founder of Houston
 Stephen F. Austin (1793–1836), "father of Texas"
 Padre José Nicolás Ballí (c. 1770–1829), grantee, settler, and namesake of Padre Island
 Plácido Benavides (1810–1837), settler
 Joshua Brown (1816–1876), first settler of Kerrville, Texas
 John Neely Bryan (1810–1877), founder of Dallas
 Moses Austin Bryan (1817–1895), early settler of Texas
 David G. Burnet (1788–1870), interim President of Republic of Texas
 Mathew Caldwell (1798–1842), settler
 Prince Carl of Solms-Braunfels (1812–1875), established colonies of German immigrants in Texas
 Henri Castro (1786–1865), Jewish empresario
 William Leslie Cazneau (1807–1876), pioneer
 Jesse Chisholm (1806–1868), Indian trader, guide, interpreter, namesake of Chisholm Trail
 Jao de la Porta (fl. 1810s), trader, financed settlement of Galveston Island
 Green DeWitt (1787–1835), empresario, namesake of DeWitt County
 Susanna Dickinson (1814–1883), DeWitt Colonist, witnessed and survived Battle of the Alamo
 John Marie Durst (1797–1851), settler
 Angelina Eberly (1798–1860), stopped the attempted removal from Austin of the Republic of Texas Archives, thereby preserving Austin's status as the capital of Texas
 Johann Friedrich Ernst (born Friedrich Diercks) (1796–1848), first German to bring family to Texas, benefactor to German immigrants
 Warren Angus Ferris (1810–1873), early surveyor of Dallas
 Henry Francis Fisher (1805–1867), German settler, explored and colonized San Saba area
 Samuel Rhoads Fisher (1794–1839), settler in Republic of Texas and later its Secretary of Navy; namesake of Fisher County
 Betty Holekamp (1826–1902), German Texan pioneer, called the Betsy Ross of Texas
 Sam Houston (1793–1863), first and third President of Republic of Texas, later U.S. Senator and Governor of Texas
 Anson Jones (1798–1858), last President of Republic of Texas, called "Architect of Annexation"
 Mirabeau B. Lamar (1798–1859), second President of Republic of Texas, one of strongest proponents of Texas Navy
 Herman Lehmann (1859–1932), kidnapped in 1870 and raised by Apache Indians
 Gideon Lincecum (1793–1874), pioneer, historian, physician, philosopher, naturalist
 Jane Herbert Wilkinson Long (1798–1880), considered the "mother of Texas"
 Collin McKinney (1766–1861), drafter of Texas Declaration of Independence; both Collin County and its county seat, McKinney, are named for him
 John Henry Moore (1800–1880), early settler
 Jose Antonio Navarro (1795–1871), Texas statesman, revolutionary and politician
 Robert Neighbors (1815–1859), Indian agent, soldier, legislator
 Cynthia Ann Parker (1826–1870), kidnapped in 1836 and raised by Comanche Indians; mother of Quanah Parker, the last Comanche Chief
 Daniel Parker (1781–1844), settler, church founder
 James W. Parker (1797–1864), early settler
 John Parker (1758–1836), pioneer Texas settler
 John Richard Parker (1834–1915), kidnapped in 1836 by Comanche Indians
 Emily Austin Perry (1795–1851), early settler of Texas
 Elijah Sterling Clack Robertson (1820–1879), early settler, translator, lawyer, postmaster
 Sterling C. Robertson (1785–1842), impresario, colony founder; signed Texas Declaration of Independence
 Thomas Jefferson Rusk (1803–1857), Secretary of War of Republic of Texas, Chief Justice of Supreme Court of Texas, U.S. Senator after state's admission to U.S.
 Charles Stillman (1810–1875), founder of Brownsville, Texas
 Edwin Waller (1800–1881), judge and signer of Texas Declaration of Independence
 Lorenzo de Zavala (1788–1836), first vice president of Republic of Texas, signer of Texas Declaration of Independence

Military

The Texas Revolution/The Alamo

 Richard Andrews (1797?–1835), the first Texian killed during the Texas Revolution
 James Bowie (1796–1836), frontiersman, died at Battle of the Alamo
 William Joel Bryan (1815–1903), soldier in Texas Revolution, landowner
 Edward Burleson (1798–1851), lieutenant colonel during Texas Revolution, later Vice President of Republic of Texas
 John Coker (1789–1851), hero of San Jacinto
 Davy Crockett (1786–1836), frontiersman and U.S. Congressman from Tennessee, died at Alamo
 Almaron Dickinson (1800–1836), Texian soldier, died at Alamo
 James Fannin (c. 1804–1836), key figure during Texas Revolution
 Thomas Green (1814–1864), artillery officer at San Jacinto, brigadier general in Confederate Army
 Sam Houston (1793–1863), commander of victorious Texian Army at the Battle of San Jacinto, which won independence for Texas
 Henry Karnes (1812–1840), soldier and commander in Texas Revolution
 Robert J. Kleberg (1803–1888), veteran of Battle of San Jacinto; descendants owned and managed King Ranch
 Antonio Menchaca (1800–1879), soldier in the Texas Army; he helped convince Houston to allow Tejanos to fight in the battle of San Jacinto
 Benjamin Milam (1788–1835), commander in Texas Revolution
 Emily West Morgan (c. 1815–1891), indentured servant known as "The Yellow Rose of Texas" who, legend has it, helped win Texas Revolution
 Juan Seguín (1806–1890), Tejano soldier during Texas Revolution
 John William Smith (1792–1845), fought at Battle of San Jacinto; later first mayor of San Antonio
 Alfonso Steele (1817–1911), last survivor of Battle of San Jacinto
 William B. Travis (1809–1836), commander of Texas forces at Alamo
 Logan Vandeveer (1815–1855), hero of San Jacinto
 William A. A. "Bigfoot" Wallace (1817–1899), Texas Ranger who fought in Texas Revolution, Mexican–American War, Civil War

American Civil War

 John Baylor (1822–1894), Confederate colonel, politician, military governor of Arizona Territory
 John Henry Brown (1820–1895), Confederate officer, served on staffs of two generals
 Nicholas Henry Darnell (1807–1885), leader of 18th Texas Cavalry Regiment, known as "Darnell's Regiment"; Speaker of House for both Republic of Texas and state of Texas
 Dick Dowling (1838–1867), commander at Sabine Pass and famous Houstonian
 John "Rip" Ford (1815–1897), Texas Rangers legend and commander at Battle of Palmito Ranch
 Milton M. Holland (1844–1910), Union soldier, won Medal of Honor
 John Bell Hood (1831–1879), commander of Hood's Texas Brigade and Confederate General
 Samuel Ealy Johnson Sr. (1838–1915), soldier, grandfather of U.S. President Lyndon Baines Johnson
 Albert Sidney Johnston (1803–1862), Confederate General and commander of Confederate western forces
 John J. Kennedy (1813–1880), Confederate cavalry officer, ended Regulator-Moderator War
 John B. Magruder (1807–1871), Confederate General at Battle of Galveston
 Benjamin McCulloch (1811–1862), soldier in Texas Revolution, Texas Ranger, U.S. Marshal, and brigadier general for Confederate States of America
 Henry Eustace McCulloch (1816–1895), soldier in Texas Revolution, Texas Ranger, and brigadier general for Confederate States of America
 William Henry Parsons (1826–1907), colonel, Twelfth Texas Cavalry; newspaper editor, legislator
 Felix Huston Robertson (1839–1928), only Confederate general who was native-born Texan
 Lawrence Sullivan "Sul" Ross (1838–1898), Confederate general, Governor of Texas, President of Texas A&M University, namesake of Sul Ross State University
 William Read Scurry (1821–1864), Confederate General at Battle of Glorieta Pass
 Pleasant Tackitt (1803–1886), Confederate Officer and county official at Fort Belknap; a founder of Parker County
 Charles S. West (1829–1885), Confederate officer and judge advocate general for Trans-Mississippi Department
 Louis T. Wigfall (1816–1874), Confederate General and Senator from Texas, secured surrender of Fort Sumter

World War I

 Charles Gray Catto (1896–1972), flying ace credited with eight aerial victories
 Daniel R. Edwards (1897–1967), received Medal of Honor
 William S. Graves (1895–1940), commander of US forces in Siberia during the allied intervention in Russia
 David E. Hayden (1897–1974), Navy corpsman, Medal of Honor recipient
 Robert Lee Howze (1864–1926), Major General of 38th Infantry Division, commander of Third Army of Occupation of Germany, Medal of Honor recipient
 Louis Jordan (1890–1918), 1914 All American, first US Army officer from Texas to be killed in action during World War I
 William Thomas Ponder (1893–1947), flying ace credited with six aerial victories
 Marcelino Serna (1896–1992), Army private, first Hispanic to be awarded the Distinguished Service Cross
 Edgar Gardner Tobin (1896–1954), flying ace credited with six aerial victories

World War II

 Harlon Block (1924–1945), raised flag on Mt. Suribachi at Iwo Jima
 Romus Burgin (1922–2019), U.S. Marine, author
 Charles P. Cabell (1903–1971), U.S. Air Force general; later deputy director of Central Intelligence Agency
 Horace S. Carswell Jr. (1916–1944), Army Air Corps major, awarded Medal of Honor
 Claire Chennault (1893–1958), commander of "Flying Tigers"
 Robert G. Cole (1915–1944), soldier, won Medal of Honor for role in D-Day Normandy invasion
 Samuel David Dealey (1906–1944), U.S. Navy submarine commander, received Medal of Honor and other distinctions for valor
 Dwight D. Eisenhower (1890–1969), Supreme Allied Commander WWII and 34th President of the U.S.
 Ira C. Eaker (1896–1987), commander of Eighth Air Force in World War II
 Calvin Graham (1930–1992), youngest US serviceman of World War II
 David Lee "Tex" Hill (1915–2007), fighter pilot, flying ace
 Oveta Culp Hobby (1905–1995), Colonel Women's Army Corps, first secretary of Department of Health, Education and Welfare
 James L. Holloway Jr. (1898–1984), U.S. Navy four-star admiral; Superintendent of U.S. Naval Academy
 Neel E. Kearby (1911–1944), fighter ace, Medal of Honor recipient
 Raymond L. Knight (1922–1945), aviator, Medal of Honor recipient
 Turney W. Leonard (1921–1944), Army officer, received Medal of Honor
 Felix Z. Longoria Jr. (1920–1945), Hispanic soldier KIA in the Philippines whose burial was refused in hometown, causing statewide debate
 Glenn McDuffie (1927–2014), sailor featured kissing nurse in Alfred Eisenstaedt's iconic photograph V-J Day in Times Square
 Doris Miller (1919–1943), Pearl Harbor hero, first African American to receive Navy Cross
 Audie Murphy (1924–1971), World War II hero, actor, Medal of Honor Recipient
 Chester Nimitz (1885–1966), commander of Allied naval forces in Pacific during World War II
 Richard Arvin Overton (1906–2018), U.S. Army sergeant; from May 2016 until his death was the oldest surviving American military veteran
 Bruce Palmer Jr. (1913–2000), U.S. Army officer, Chief of Staff of the United States Army during Vietnam War
 John L. Pierce (1895–1959), U.S. Army Brigadier General
 James Earl Rudder (1910–1970), D-Day commander of the U.S. Army 2nd Ranger Battalion, which stormed cliffs at Pointe du Hoc
 William H. Simpson (1888–1980), commander of U.S. Ninth Army in European Theater
 Lucian K. Truscott (1895–1965), U.S. Army General who held successive commands in European Theater
 Edwin Walker (1909–1993), U.S. Army Major General known for conservative views and attempted assassination target for Lee Harvey Oswald
 Walton Walker (1889–1950), U.S. Army general who served under Patton in European Theater and later in Korean War

Korean War

 Charles F. Pendleton (1931–1953), awarded Medal of Honor
 Oliver P. Smith (1893–1977), U.S. Marine Corps general noted for his leadership in Battle of Chosin Reservoir
 Edwin Walker (1909–1993), U.S. Army Major General, attempted assassination target of Lee Harvey Oswald
 Walton Walker (1889–1950), U.S. Army general, first commander of U.S. Eighth Army during Korean War

Vietnam War

 Raul (Roy) Perez Benavidez (1935–1998), awarded Medal of Honor for actions in South Vietnam
 Steven Logan Bennett (1946–1972) Captain United States Air Force received Medal of Honor Posthumously for actions in Vietnam
 Richard E. Cavazos (1929–2017), first Hispanic four-star general in U.S. Army, earned two Distinguished Service Crosses; as of 2022 a process is underway to rename Fort Hood as Fort Cavazos
 Alfredo Cantu Gonzalez (1946–1968), Sergeant, USMC, Medal of Honor recipient
 Fred E. Haynes Jr. (1921–2010), Major General, USMC
 David H. McNerney (1931–2010), 1st Sergeant U.S. Army, Medal of Honor, Vietnam 1967
 Oliver North (born 1943), Lieutenant-Colonel, USMC (retired), NRA board member and founder of the Freedom Alliance
 Chester M. Ovnand (1914–1959), Master Sergeant, U.S. Army, second American killed in Vietnam War
 Bruce Palmer Jr. (1913–2000), U.S. Army officer, Chief of Staff of the United States Army during Vietnam War
 Alfred M. Wilson (1948–1969), Marine Private First Class awarded Medal of Honor posthumously

Somali Civil War
 William F. Garrison (born 1944), major general, commander of United States Army forces during Operation Gothic Serpent

War in Afghanistan

 Marcus Luttrell (born 1975), U.S. Navy SEAL, was awarded the Navy Cross for actions in conflicts with Taliban
 William H. McRaven (born 1955), U.S. Navy admiral and SEAL, led planning for Operation Neptune Spear
 Patrick M. Walsh (born 1955), U.S. Navy admiral, Commander of U.S. Pacific Fleet
 Billy Waugh (born 1929), U.S. Army Special Forces, Studies and Observations Group

Iraq War

 Chris Kyle (1974–2013), U.S. Navy SEAL who fought in the Second Battle of Fallujah
 Kristian Menchaca (1983–2006), U.S. Army soldier who was captured and executed

War on Terror
Clint Lorance (born 1984), Army First Lieutenant convicted of second-degree murder for battlefield deaths; pardoned
 Michael L. Oates (born 1957), United States Army Lieutenant General

Intelligence
 Bobby Ray Inman (born 1931), U.S. Navy Admiral, Director of National Security Agency, deputy director of Central Intelligence Agency

Other
 Robert T. Clark (born 1948), U.S. Army lieutenant general, commanded United States Army North (ARNORTH)
 Alfred Valenzuela (born 1948), U.S. Army major general, commanded United States Army South (USARSO)

Politics and public office
See also :Category:Texas politicians and its subcategories.
See also :List of mayors of Austin, Texas; :List of mayors of Dallas, Texas; :List of mayors of El Paso, Texas; :List of mayors of Fort Worth, Texas; List of mayors of Houston, Texas; :List of mayors of Plano, Texas; :List of mayors of San Antonio, Texas.
A

 Greg Abbott (born 1957), Governor of Texas, former Attorney General
 Fred Agnich (1913–2004), Texas state representative, member of "Dirty 30" in 1971; oilman, rancher, conservationist
 Elsa Alcala (born 1964), judge of Texas Court of Criminal Appeals from Houston since 2011
 Elizabeth Alexander (born 1979), press secretary for Vice President Joe Biden
 Bruce Alger (1918–2015), Republican U.S. representative for Texas's 5th congressional district, based in Dallas County, 1955–1965
 Rodney Anderson (born 1968), former member of Texas House of Representatives from Grand Prairie
 Betty Andujar (1912–1997), first Republican woman to serve in Texas State Senate (1973–1983); Pennsylvania native
 Bob Armstrong (1932–2015), member of Texas House of Representatives for Travis County 1963–71; Commissioner of General Land Office 1971–83

B

 Ben Barnes (born 1938), lieutenant governor (1969–1973) of Texas; youngest House Speaker in Texas history (1965–1969)
 Ray Barnhart (1928–2013), state representative and director of Federal Highway Administration under President Reagan
 Decimus et Ultimus Barziza (1838–1882), state representative, Harris County, 1874–1876, businessman, Civil War soldier
 Robert Emmett Bledsoe Baylor (1793–1874), district judge, a framer of Texas Constitution; co-founded Baylor University
 Tina Benkiser (born 1962), former chairman of Republican Party of Texas
 Lloyd Bentsen (1921–2006), U.S. representative and U.S. senator
 Leo Berman (1936–2015), former state representative from Tyler
 Paul Bettencourt (born 1958), Republican member of Texas State Senate from Houston
 Teel Bivins (1947–2009), state senator from Amarillo and U.S. Ambassador to Sweden
 Bill Blythe (born 1935), Houston Realtor and Republican state representative from Harris County, 1971–1983
 Elton Bomer (born 1935), state representative from Anderson County and Texas Secretary of State
 Henry Bonilla (born 1954), U.S. representative from San Antonio
 Greg Bonnen (born 1966), neurosurgeon and state representative from Galveston County; brother of Dennis Bonnen
 Jeffrey S. Boyd (born 1961), associate justice of Texas Supreme Court since 2012
 Wally Brewster (born 1960), U.S. Ambassador to Dominican Republic
 John A. Brieden III (born 1955), politician and National Commander of The American Legion, 2003–2004
 Stephen Broden (born 1952), politician, professor, businessman, activist
 Esther Buckley (1948–2013), member of United States Commission on Civil Rights; educator in Laredo
 Albert S. Burleson (1863–1937), U.S. Postmaster General and Congressman
 Edward Burleson (1798–1851), Texas soldier, general, and statesman
 Joel Burns (born 1969), Fort Worth city councilman who spoke out against bullying of LGBT youth
 Jeb Bush (born 1953), former governor of Florida, reared in Midland and Houston
 Angie Chen Button (born 1954), Republican member of Texas House of Representatives from Dallas County

C

 Frank Kell Cahoon (1934–2013), Midland oilman and Republican former state representative
 Briscoe Cain (born 1984), Republican member of Texas House of Representatives for Harris County District 128, effective January 2017
 Bill Callegari (born 1941), Republican member of Texas House of Representatives from Harris County, 2001–2015
 Donna Campbell (born 1954), Texas state senator and physician from New Braunfels
 Francisco Canseco (born 1949), former U.S. representative from San Antonio
 John Carona (born 1955), state senator from Dallas County, 1996–2015
 Stefani Carter (born 1978), member of Texas House of Representatives from Dallas County since 2011; first African-American female Republican to serve in state House
 Carlos Cascos (born 1952), Secretary of State of Texas in Abbott administration
 Henry E. Catto Jr. (1930–2011), U.S. diplomat, businessman
 Lauro Cavazos (1927–2022), U.S. Secretary of Education in the George H. W. Bush administration, first Hispanic U.S. Cabinet officer
 Francis Cherry (1908–1965), Governor of Arkansas 1953–55, born in Fort Worth
 Wayne Christian (born 1950), Republican former state representative from Center and Nacogdoches; candidate for Texas Railroad Commission in 2014
 Henry Cisneros (born 1947), former mayor of San Antonio and United States Secretary of Housing and Urban Development
 Ronald H. Clark (born 1953), federal judge; former member of Texas House of Representatives
 Tom C. Clark (1899–1977), United States Attorney General and Associate Justice of Supreme Court of the United States
 David Cobb (born 1962), 2004 U.S. presidential candidate for Green Party
 Cathy Cochran (1944–2021), retiring judge of Texas Court of Criminal Appeals
 Susan Combs (born 1945), Texas comptroller and agriculture commissioner, state representative
 John B. Connally Jr. (1917–1993), Secretary of the Navy, Governor of Texas, US Treasury Secretary
 John Cornyn (born 1952), United States Senator since 2002
 Tom Craddick (born 1943), member of Texas House of Representatives from Midland; former Speaker
 Juanita Craft (1902–1985), Dallas city council member, civil rights activist
 Brandon Creighton (born 1970), member of Texas House of Representatives from Conroe; House Majority Leader (2013), attorney, businessman, and rancher
 Ted Cruz (born 1971), Canadian-born politician, Texas Senator since 2013, and former 2016 presidential candidate
 Henry Cuellar (born 1955), U.S. Representative from Texas's 28th congressional district; native of Laredo

D–F

 Tony Dale (born 1969), Republican member of Texas House of Representatives from Williamson County since 2013
 Price Daniel (1910–1988), Democratic US Senator and 38th Governor of Texas
 Nicholas Henry Darnell (1807–1885), Speaker of House for both Republic of Texas and state of Texas
 John E. Davis (born 1960), Republican member of Texas House of Representatives from Houston since 1999
 Wendy Davis (born 1963), Texas State Senator from Tarrant County, Democratic gubernatorial nominee in 2014
 Jay Dean (born 1953), mayor of Longview, 2005–2015; state representative for Gregg and Upshur counties, effective 2017
 David Dewhurst (born 1945), Lieutenant Governor of Texas, 2003–2015
 Charles Duncan Jr. (1926–2022), U.S. Deputy Secretary of Defense 1977–1979, Secretary of Energy 1979–1981
 Gary Elkins (born 1955), Republican member of Texas House of Representatives from Houston since 1995
 Pat Fallon (born 1967), member of Texas House of Representatives from Denton County
 Marsha Farney (born 1958), state representative from Williamson County since 2013; member of the Texas State Board of Education 2011–2013; businesswoman and former educator
 James E. "Pa" Ferguson (1871–1944), governor of Texas (1915–1917), impeached, convicted, and removed from office
 Miriam "Ma" Ferguson (1875–1961), first female Governor of Texas
 Mindy Finn (born 1980), media strategist, conservative feminist activist, independent U.S. vice presidential candidate in 2016
 Charles R. Floyd (1881–1945), Texas State Senator, State Representative, and co-founder of Paris Junior College
 Dan Flynn (1943–2022), Republican member of Texas House of Representatives from Van Zandt County
 James Frank (born 1967), member of Texas House of Representatives from Wichita Falls

G

 Rick Galindo (born 1981), Republican member of Texas House of Representatives from District 117 in Bexar County, effective 2015
 Pete Gallego (born 1961), U.S. representative from Texas's 23rd congressional district
 H. S. "Buddy" Garcia (born 1967), former interim 2012 member of Texas Railroad Commission
 John Nance Garner (1868–1967), 44th Speaker of the US House and 32nd Vice President of the United States
 Tony Garza (born 1958), former U.S. ambassador to Mexico
 Charlie Geren (born 1949), member of Texas House of Representatives from his native Fort Worth
 Pete Geren (born 1952), former member of United States House of Representatives from Texas's 12th congressional district and United States Secretary of the Army
 Craig Goldman (born 1968), member of Texas House of Representatives from his native Fort Worth
 Alberto Gonzales (born 1955), United States Attorney General
 Henry B. Gonzalez (1916–2000), U.S. representative from San Antonio
 John W. Goode (1923–1994), Republican lawyer from San Antonio; lost 1961 House race to Henry B. Gonzalez
 Austan Goolsbee (born 1969), Chairperson of Council of Economic Advisers under President Barack Obama
 Tony Goolsby (1933–2020), Republican member of Texas House of Representatives from Dallas County, 1989–2009
 Blake Gottesman (born 1980), aide to President George W. Bush
 Phil Gramm (born 1942), former United States Senator
 Tom Greenwell (1956–2013)
 Jesse Edward Grinstead (1866–1948), one-time mayor of Kerrville and state legislator
 Henry C. Grover (1927–2005), state legislator, 1972 Republican gubernatorial nominee

H–I

 Bob Hall (born 1942), Texas state senator from Van Zandt County
 Holly Ham (born 1972), executive director of the White House Initiative on Asian Americans and Pacific Islanders at the United States Department of Education
 Rick Hardcastle (born 1956), Republican former member of Texas House form Wilbarger County
 Will Ford Hartnett (born 1956), Dallas lawyer and Republican member of Texas House, 1991–2013
 Talmadge L. Heflin (born 1940), former state representative from Harris County, director of Center for Fiscal Policy at Texas Public Policy Foundation
 Glenn Hegar (born 1970), state senator and Republican candidate for state comptroller in 2014
 Jeb Hensarling (born 1957), U.S. representative
 Harvey Hilderbran (born 1960), state representative from Kerrville; Republican candidate for state comptroller in 2014
 Jim Hogg (1851–1906), first native Texan to become Governor of Texas
 Vernon Edgar Howard (1937–1998), representative of the Texas House of Representatives, 1969–1975
 Dan Huberty (born 1968), Republican member of Texas House of Representatives from Harris County
 Joan Huffman (born 1956), former Houston criminal court judge; Republican member of Texas State Senate
 Bryan Hughes (born 1969), Republican member of Texas House of Representatives from Wood County
 Swanee Hunt (born 1950), U.S. Ambassador
 Robert Dean Hunter (1928–2023), member of Texas House of Representatives from Abilene, 1986–2007
 Todd A. Hunter (born 1953), state representative, 1989–1997, 2009–present
 Thad Hutcheson (1915–1986), Houston lawyer and Republican politician
 Kay Bailey Hutchison (born 1943), first woman U.S. Senator from Texas, 1993–2013
 Ray Hutchison (1932–2014), Dallas lawyer and Republican former politician
 Frank N. Ikard (1913–1991), U.S. representative from Texas's 13th congressional district, 1951–1961
 Sarah Isgur (born 1982), attorney and political analyst

J–L

 Alphonso Jackson (born 1945), U.S. Secretary of Housing and Urban Development under President George W. Bush
 Wallace B. Jefferson (born 1963), Chief Justice of Supreme Court of Texas; resigned 2013
 Cheryl Johnson, Austin lawyer and judge of Texas Court of Criminal Appeals
 Elizabeth Ames Jones (born 1956), former Texas Railroad Commissioner, member of Texas House of Representatives
 Gina Ortiz Jones (born 1981), U.S Under Secretary of the Air Force
 Jesse H. Jones (1874–1956), U.S. Secretary of Commerce under President Franklin D. Roosevelt
 Barbara Jordan (1936–1996), member of United States House of Representatives
 Rudy Juedeman (1908–2004), Odessa businessman and Republican politician
 Kyle Kacal (born 1969), Republican member of Texas House of Representatives from District 12
 David S. Kaufman (1813–1851), only Jew from Texas to serve in U.S. House of Representatives (1846–1851) before 1970s
 Bill Keffer (born 1958), Dallas lawyer who served in Texas House (District 107), 2003–2007
 Jim Keffer (born 1953), Eastland businessman and current Republican member of Texas House (District 60); brother of Bill Keffer
 Isaac Herbert Kempner (1873–1967), Mayor of Galveston, founder of Imperial Sugar
 Mark Keough (born 1953), Republican member of Texas House of Representatives from The Woodlands in Montgomery County
 Ken King (born 1971), Republican member of Texas House of Representatives from Canadian in Hemphill County
 Ron Kirk (born 1954), United States Trade Representative; former Texas Secretary of State, former mayor of Dallas
 Lois Kolkhorst (born 1964), member of Texas House of Representatives from Washington County since 2001
 Linda Koop (born 1950), member of Texas House from Dallas County; former member of the Dallas City Council
 Bob Krueger (1935–2022), former U.S. Ambassador, U.S. Senator and Congressman (New Braunfels, Comal County)
 Dan Kubiak (1938–1998), state representative, businessman, educator
 Barbara Lee (born 1946), U.S. Representative from California
 Debra Lehrmann (born 1956), Texas Supreme Court justice, elected 2010
 Eugene M. Locke (1918–1972), ambassador to Pakistan, deputy ambassador to South Vietnam, was awarded Presidential Medal of Freedom; candidate for Governor of Texas
 J. M. Lozano (born 1980), member of Texas House of Representatives from Kingsville; native of Mexico
 Lanham Lyne (born 1955), Mayor of Wichita Falls, state representative 2011–13

M

 George H. Mahon (1900–1985), U.S. representative from Texas's 19th congressional district 1935 until 1979
 Charles R. Matthews (born 1939), former Texas Railroad Commissioner and chancellor-emeritus of Texas State University System
 Jim Mattox (1943–2008), U.S. representative and attorney general of Texas
 Maury Maverick (1895–1954), Democratic U.S. representative
 Glen Maxey (born 1952), state representative from Austin
 Ruth McClendon (1943–2017), African-American Democrat member of Texas House of Representatives from San Antonio since 1996
 Don McLeroy (born 1946), former chairman and member of Texas State Board of Education; dentist, young-earth creationist
 Tom Mechler (born 1956), Texas Republican state chairman since 2015; oil and gas consultant in Amarillo
 Will Metcalf (born 1984), state representative from Montgomery County since 2015
 Rick Miller (born 1946), member of Texas House of Representatives from Sugar Land; former Republican party chairman in Fort Bend County
 Hilmar Moore (1920–2012), mayor of Richmond, 1949–2012, longest tenure of any elected official in U.S. history
 William T. "Bill" Moore (1918–1999), state senator from Bryan, known as "Bull of the Brazos" and "father of the modern Texas A&M University"
 Robert Morrow (born 1964), chairman of Republican Party of Travis County since 2016; considered a conspiracy theorist
 Azie Taylor Morton (1936–2003), Treasurer of the United States
 Steve Munisteri (born 1957), chairman of Republican Party of Texas, 2010–2015
 Jim Murphy (born 1957), Republican member of Texas House of Representatives from District 133 in Houston, 2007–2009 and since 2011

N–O

 David Newell (born 1971), judge of Texas Court of Criminal Appeals, Place 9; Houston attorney
 James Robertson Nowlin (born 1937), U.S. District Judge for Western District of Texas; one of first two Republicans since Reconstruction to represent Bexar County in Texas House of Representatives
 James E. Nugent (1922–2016), former Democratic member of Texas Railroad Commission and the Texas House of Representatives
 W. Lee "Pappy" O'Daniel (1890–1969), Governor of Texas and U.S. senator
 Tom Oliverson (born 1972), anesthesiologist, Republican member of Texas House of Representatives
 Dora Olivo (born 1943), attorney and former member of Texas House of Representatives for Fort Bend County
 Bill Owens (born 1950), former Governor of Colorado
 Alvin M. Owsley (1888–1967), diplomat

P

 Susan Pamerleau (born 1946), retired United States Air Force major general and Republican sheriff of Bexar County, first woman elected to that position, 2012
 Hugh Q. Parmer (1939–2020), former Mayor of Fort Worth and member of both houses of Texas State Legislature
 Brad Parscale (born 1976), political strategist
 Dan Patrick (born 1950), Lieutenant Governor of Texas, former member of Texas State Senate and radio broadcaster
 Diane Patrick (born 1946), former member of Texas House of Representatives from Arlingon
 Jerry E. Patterson (born 1946), Texas Land Commissioner; former state senator, candidate for lieutenant governor in 2014
 Thomas Pauken (born 1944), Texas Republican chairman, 1994–1997, lawyer and political commentator
 Gilbert Peña (born 1949), Republican member of Texas House of Representatives from Pasadena
 Rick Perry (born 1950), Governor of Texas, 2000–15; United States Secretary of Energy
 Dade Phelan (born 1975), Republican state representative from Beaumont
 Larry Phillips (born 1966), Republican member of Texas House of Representatives from Sherman
 Thomas R. Phillips (born 1949), former Chief Justice of Texas Supreme Court
 Katrina Pierson (born 1976), Tea Party activist, Donald Trump campaign spokesperson
 Dan Pope (born 1963), Mayor of Lubbock since 2016
 David J. Porter (born 1954), member of Railroad Commission of Texas, elected November 2, 2010
 Robert "Bob" Price (1927–2004), U.S. representative from Pampa in Texas Panhandle
 Tom Price (born 1945), judge of Texas Court of Criminal Appeals, 1997–2015, and the Dallas-based 282nd Court, 1987–1997
 Walter Thomas Price, IV (born 1968), state representative from Amarillo, first elected November 2, 2010
 Graham B. Purcell Jr. (1919–2011), U.S. representative from Texas's 13th congressional district, 1962–1973; Wichita Falls lawyer

R

 Jack Rains (born 1937), former Texas secretary of state
 John N. Raney (born 1947), member of Texas House of Representatives from Brazos County since 2011
 Bennett Ratliff (born 1961), member of Texas House of Representative from Dallas County (2013–2015)
 Bill Ratliff (born 1936), state senator and lieutenant governor from Mount Pleasant
 Sam Rayburn (1882–1961), U.S. Congressman and Speaker of the House of Representatives
 Richard P. Raymond (born 1960), South Texas state representative
 Ron Reynolds (born 1973), African-American Democrat member of Texas House of Representatives from District 27 in Missouri City
 Ann Richards (1933–2006), second woman governor of Texas (1991–1995); state treasurer (1983–1991)
 Cecile Richards (born 1957), liberal political activist, daughter of Ann Richards
 Matt Rinaldi (born 1975), member of Texas House of Representatives from Dallas County since 2015
 Roy R. Rubottom Jr. (1912–2010), diplomat
 Jim Rudd (born 1943), lawyer and lobbyist in Austin; former Texas state representative from Brownfield

Sa–Sl

 Paul Sadler (born 1955), state representative, Democrat U.S. Senate nominee in 2012, lost to Republican Ted Cruz
 Pete Saenz (born 1951), mayor of Laredo
 Joe Sage (1920–1977), one of first two Republicans since Reconstruction to represent Bexar County in Texas House of Representatives
 Mario Marcel Salas (born 1949), civil rights activist, politician
 Tom Schieffer (born 1947), diplomat, brother of CBS anchorman Bob Schieffer
 Pete Sessions (born 1955), U.S. representative
 Sonal Shah (born 1968), economist and public official with Obama Administration
 John Sharp (born 1950), former Texas Comptroller of Public Accounts, chancellor of Texas A&M University
 J. D. Sheffield (born 1960), member of Texas House of Representatives from Coryell County since 2013; physician in Gatesville
 Mark M. Shelton (born 1956), pediatrician and member of Texas House of Representatives from District 97 (Fort Worth), 2009–2013
 David McAdams Sibley (born 1948), attorney-lobbyist, Texas state senator (1991–2002), Mayor of Waco (1987–1988)
 Ron Simmons (born 1960), member of Texas House of Representatives from Carrollton since 2013
 Ryan Sitton (born 1975), Republican nominee for Texas Railroad Commission in 2014 general election

Sm–Sz

 Preston Smith (1912–2003), Governor of Texas (1969–1973) and lieutenant governor (1963–1969)
 Steven Wayne Smith (born 1961), member of Texas Supreme Court (2002–2005)
 Wayne Smith (born 1943), member of Texas House of Representatives from District 128 in Harris County since 2003
 Barry Smitherman (born 1957), former member of Texas Railroad Commission; unsuccessful candidate for attorney general in 2014
 Clay Smothers (1935–2004), member of Texas House of Representatives; operator of St. Paul Industrial Training School orphanage in Malakoff; radio personality
 Burt Solomons (born 1950) Denton County lawyer and Republican member of Texas House of Representatives, 1995–2013
 Margaret Spellings (born 1957), U.S. Secretary of Education (2005–2009)
 Drew Springer Jr. (born 1966), member of the Texas House of Representatives from District 68 (North Texas and eastern South Plains)
 Barbara Staff (1924–2019), co-chairman of 1976 Ronald Reagan Texas presidential primary campaign
 Sylvia Stanfield (born 1943), diplomat
 Robert Stanton (born 1940), director of National Park Service
 Todd Staples (born 1963), Texas agriculture commissioner; candidate for lieutenant governor in 2014
 Ken Starr (born 1946), federal judge, Solicitor General, and Independent Counsel during Clinton Administration
 William Steger (1920–2006), U.S. District Judge
 Jonathan Stickland (born 1983), member of Texas House of Representatives from Tarrant County since 2013
 Steve Stockman (born 1956), member of U.S. House of Representatives from Texas; candidate for Republican nomination for U.S. Senate in 2014
 Robert Schwarz Strauss (1918–2014), politician, chairman of Democratic National Committee, and diplomat
 Dwayne Stovall (born 1966), Cleveland, Texas, businessman and Republican candidate for U.S. Senate against John Cornyn in primary election scheduled March 4, 2014
 Carole Keeton Strayhorn (born 1939), Texas comptroller (1999–2007), railroad commissioner, former Mayor of Austin
 Raymond Strother (1940–2022), political consultant, native of Port Arthur
 Michael Quinn Sullivan (born 1970), reporter, political activist, president of Texans for Fiscal Responsibility

T–V

 Robert Talton (born 1945), police officer, attorney, member of Texas House of Representatives from Harris County 1993–2009; candidate for Chief Justice of Texas Supreme Court in 2014 Republican primary
 Buddy Temple (1942–2015), businessman, state representative from Angelina County, and railroad commissioner
 Tony Tinderholt (born 1970), member of Texas House of Representatives from Arlington
 Raul Torres (born 1956), former state representative from Nueces County
 Steve Toth (born 1960), member of Texas House of Representatives, 2013–2015, from The Woodlands
 John G. Tower (1925–1991), first Republican U.S. Senator from Texas since Reconstruction
 Lupe Valdez (born 1947), only female elected sheriff in Texas
 Gary VanDeaver (born 1958), Republican member of Texas House of Representatives from Bowie County, effective 2015
 Jason Villalba (born 1971), state representative from Dallas County since 2013; Dallas attorney with Haynes and Boone
 Catalina Vasquez Villalpando (born 1940), Treasurer of the United States

W–Z

 Dale Wainwright (born 1961), former associate justice of Texas Supreme Court
 Richard A. Waterfield (1939–2007), state representative who advocated for feeding programs for disabled and elderly
 Craig Watkins, first African-American district attorney in Texas, Dallas Morning News Texan of the Year 2008
 Reed N. Weisiger (1838–1908), Texas State Senator (1891–1893), Confederate cavalry officer, pioneer in Victoria County
 Jack Wheeler (1944–2010), presidential aide to Ronald Reagan, George H. W. Bush, and George W. Bush administrations
 Molly S. White (born 1958), Republican member of Texas House of Representatives from Bell County 
 John Roger Williams (born 1949), Republican U.S. representative from Texas, former Texas secretary of state, professional baseball player
 Michael L. Williams (born 1953), director of Texas Education Agency, former Texas Railroad Commissioner, former assistant Secretary of Education for Civil Rights
 Barry Williamson (born 1957), Republican former member of Texas Railroad Commission
 Arlene Wohlgemuth (born 1947), Republican member of Texas House of Representatives from Johnson County, 1995–2005; executive director of the Texas Public Policy Foundation; ran unsuccessfully against Chet Edwards for Congress in 2004
 Jared Woodfill (born 1968), Houston attorney and chairman of Harris County Republican Party, 2002–2014
 John Lee Wortham (1862–1924), Texas Railroad Commissioner and Secretary of State, businessman
 Betsey Wright (born 1943), political lobbyist, activist, consultant
 Clymer Wright (1932–2011), political activist; father of municipal term limits in Houston
 Jim Wright (1922–2015), former Congressman and Speaker of the House of Representatives
 Vicente T. Ximenes (1919–2014), Mexican-American civil rights pioneer, U.S. politician
 Ralph Yarborough (1903–1996), state senator, 1957 –1971; leader of progressive or liberal wing of his party
 Judith Zaffirini (born 1946), state senator from Laredo
 Bill Zedler (born 1943), member of Texas House of Representatives from Arlington
 Brian Zimmerman (1972–1996), elected mayor of Crabb at age 11

U.S. Presidents

 George H. W. Bush (1924–2018), 41st President and 43rd Vice President of the United States (raised in Greenwich, Connecticut, but lived much of his adult life in West Texas)
 George W. Bush (born 1946), 43rd President of the United States (born in New Haven, Connecticut, but raised in Texas)
 Dwight D. Eisenhower (1890–1969), 34th President of the United States (born in Denison, but raised in Kansas)
 Lyndon B. Johnson (1908–1973), 36th President of the United States (1963–69); Vice President (1961–63) (born and raised near Stonewall)

Notable women of Texas

 Jessie Daniel Ames (1883–1972), suffragette, civil rights activist
 Sarah Campbell Blaffer (1885–1975), philanthropist; namesake of Blaffer Art Museum in Houston
 Annie Webb Blanton (1870–1945), suffragist, educator
 Mary Eleanor Brackenridge (1837–1924), social activist, university regent
 Mary Couts Burnett (1856–1924), philanthropist
 Laura Bush (born 1946), First Lady of the United States
 Mary Elizabeth Butt (1903–1993), philanthropist
 Minnie Fisher Cunningham (1882–1964), women's suffragist
 Nannie Webb Curtis (1861–1920), president, Texas Woman's Christian Temperance Union
 May Dickson Exall (1859–1936), civic leader, founder of Dallas Public Library
 Gloria Feldt (born 1942), feminist leader, author, political commentator
 Margaret Formby (1929–2003), founder of the National Cowgirl Museum and Hall of Fame in Fort Worth
 Mariette Rheiner Garner (1869–1948), Second Lady of the United States
 Melinda Gates (born 1964), philanthropist, wife of software magnate Bill Gates
 Edna Gladney (1886–1961), founder of "The Edna Gladney Home" for orphaned children
 Nellie Gray (1924–2012), anti-abortion activist
 Margaret Hunt Hill (1915–2007), heiress, philanthropist
 Ima Hogg (1882–1975), philanthropist
 Helen LaKelly Hunt (born 1949), philanthropist for women's causes
 Lady Bird Johnson (1912–2007), former First Lady of the United States (married to President Lyndon B. Johnson)
 Maura McNiel (1921–2020), activist for women's rights
 Lucy Pickett (1832–1899), socialite, Southern belle; known as the "Queen of the Confederacy", her portrait appeared on some Confederate currency
 Cecile Richards (born 1957), activist, president of Planned Parenthood
 Jennie Scott Scheuber (1860–1944), librarian, women's-suffrage activist, civic leader
 Belle Hunt Shortridge (1858-1893), author and poet
 Ruth Carter Stevenson (1923–2013), arts patron, museum founder
 Virginia Whitehill (1928–2018), activist for women's rights
 Martha E. Whitten (1842-1917), author, poet, hymnist
 Kristy Scott (born 1995), social media personality, digital creator, filmmaker

Entertainment

Dance

 Joshua Allen (born 1989), dancer, 2008 winner of So You Think You Can Dance
 Lauren Anderson (born 1965), ballet dancer; first African-American ballerina to be principal of a major company (Houston Ballet)
 Corky Ballas (born 1960), ballroom dancer
 Mark Ballas (born 1986), ballroom dancer, choreographer, actor, musician, and singer-songwriter 
 Candy Barr (1935–2005), model, burlesque dancer
 Cyd Charisse (1922–2008), actress, dancer
 Bebe Daniels (1901–1971), actress, singer, dancer, writer, producer
 Gussie Nell Davis (1906–1993), physical education teacher who founded the Kilgore College Rangerettes drill team
 Kelli Finglass (born 1964), dancer, director of Dallas Cowboys Cheerleaders
 Summer Glau (born 1981), dancer and actress, Firefly
 Chachi Gonzales (born 1996), dancer
 Nathalie Krassovska (1918–2005), ballerina, ballet teacher
 Ann Miller (1923–2004), actress, dancer
 Annette O'Toole (born 1952), dancer, actress
 Ginger Rogers (1911–1995), actress, singer, dancer
 Ross Sisters, Betsy (1926–1996), Vickie (1927–2002), and Dixie (1929–1963), Broadway singers, dancers, contortionists
 Kelly Rowland (born 1981), R&B singer-songwriter, dancer, actress
 George Skibine (1920–1981), ballet dancer, choreographer
 Solange (born 1986), R&B singer-songwriter, actress, model, dancer, producer, director
 Ben Stevenson (born 1936), artistic director of Houston Ballet and Texas Ballet Theater
 Patsy Swayze (1927–2013), choreographer, dancer, dance teacher
 Judy Trammell (born 1958), choreographer for Dallas Cowboys Cheerleaders

Fashion and modeling

 Lisa Baker (born 1944), Playboy Playmate of the Year
 Tyson Ballou (born 1976), model
 Candy Barr (1935–2005), model, burlesque dancer
 Brooke Burns (born 1978), model, actress
 Lois Chiles (born 1947), model, actress
 Ashley Cox (born 1956), model, actress, Playboy Playmate
 Chloe Dao (born 1972), fashion designer
 Hope Dworaczyk (born 1984), model, Playboy Playmate of the Year
 Kelly Emberg (born 1959), model, former partner of Rod Stewart
 Hannah Ferguson (born 1992), model
 Tom Ford (born 1961), former creative director for Gucci, film director
 Michelle Galdenzi (born 1987), model, actress
 Jerry Hall (born 1956), model, actress
 Marcy Hanson (born 1952), Playboy Playmate, actress
 Angie Harmon (born 1972), model, actress
 Julie Haus (born 1973), fashion designer
 Kimberly Holland (born 1982), Playboy model
 Daina House (born 1954), Playboy centerfold
 Elisa Jimenez (born 1963), fashion designer, interdisciplinary artist
 Sandy Johnson (born 1954), Playboy centerfold, actress
 Tina Knowles (born 1954), businesswoman, fashion designer
 Dorian Leigh (Parker) (1917–2008), model, considered one of the first supermodels
 Kym Malin (born 1962), Playboy Playmate, actress
 Irlene Mandrell (born 1956), model, actress
 Brandon Maxwell (born 1984), fashion designer
 Kim McLagan (1948–2006), model
 Ali Michael (born 1990), model
 Kiko Mizuhara (born 1990), model, actress, Japanese television personality
 Cole Mohr (born 1986), model
 Chandra North (born 1973), model
 Derrill Osborn (1942–2019), fashion executive
 Wendy Russell Reves (1916–2007), model, philanthropist, socialite
 Kendra Scott (born 1974), fashion designer
 Joan Severance (born 1958), model, actress
 Lori Singer (born 1957), actress, model, classical musician
 Anna Nicole Smith (1967–2007), model, actress
 Kimberly Kay Smith (born 1983), model, actress
 Amir Taghi (born 1996), fashion designer
 Tila Tequila (born 1981), model, television personality
 Paola Turbay (born 1970), model, actress, beauty pageant winner
 Ann Ward (born 1991), model, winner of America's Next Top Model, Cycle 15

Film, theater, and television
A  B  C  D–E  F–G  H  I–J 
K–L  M  N–P  Q–R  S  T–U  V–Z

 A

 F. Murray Abraham (born 1939), Academy Award- and Golden Globe Award-winning actor
 Amy Acker (born 1976), actress
 Jensen Ackles (born 1978), actor, Smallville, Supernatural
 Sunrise Adams (born 1982), actress
 Dianna Agron (born 1986), actress, singer
 Norman Alden (1924–2012), actor
 Kevin Alejandro (born 1976), actor
 Jaimie Alexander (born 1984), actress
 Richard Alexander (1902–1989), actor
 Debbie Allen (born 1950), actress, choreographer, director, producer
 Joshua Allen (born 1989), dancer, 2008 winner of So You Think You Can Dance
 Krista Allen (born 1971), actress
 Marshall Allman (born 1984), actor, Prison Break, True Blood
 John A. Alonzo (1934–2001), cinematographer
 Audrey Marie Anderson (born 1975), actress, played Kim Brown on The Unit
 Jacqueline Anderson (born 1975), actress
 Wes Anderson (born 1969), director, Bottle Rocket, Rushmore, The Royal Tenenbaums
 Dana Andrews (1909–1992), actor, The Best Years of Our Lives, Laura
 Andrew Arbuckle (1887–1938), actor
 Macklyn Arbuckle (1866–1931), actor
 Melissa Archer (born 1979), actress
 Michael Arden (born 1982), actor
 Kelly Asbury (born 1960), story artist, director, writer, Shrek 2
 Frank Ashmore (born 1945), actor
 Tex Avery (1908–1980), animator, cartoonist, director

 B

 Lorri Bagley (born 1973), actress, model, Veronica's Closet, Ice Age
 G. W. Bailey (born 1944), actor, M*A*S*H, Police Academy
 Joe Don Baker (born 1936), actor, Charley Varrick, Walking Tall
 Kathy Baker (born 1950), Emmy-winning actress, Picket Fences, Boston Public
 Troy Baker (born 1976), voice actor, musician
 Greg Baldwin (born 1960), actor, Avatar: The Last Airbender
 Taylor Ball (born 1987), actor
 Reginald Ballard (born 1965), character actor, comedian, The Bernie Mac Show, Martin
 Bob Banner (1921–2011), television producer, writer, director
 Matt Barr (born 1984), actor
 Barbara Barrie (born 1931), actress, Suddenly Susan, Barney Miller, Double Trouble
 Skye McCole Bartusiak (1992–2014), actress
 Texas Battle (born 1980), actor, played Marcus Walton on The Bold and the Beautiful
 Jim Beaver (born 1950), actor, played Ellsworth on Deadwood
 David Beecroft (born 1955), actor
 Gregory Beecroft (born 1952), actor
 Madge Bellamy (1899–1990), actress
 Jeff Bennett (born 1962), voice actor, singer, Johnny Bravo
 Robby Benson (born 1956), actor, director, singer, The Legend of Prince Valiant, Ellen, Beauty and the Beast
 Robert Benton (born 1932), Academy Award-winning screenwriter and director, Kramer vs. Kramer, Places in the Heart
 Crystal Bernard (born 1961), actress and singer, television series Wings
 Angela Bettis (born 1973), actress
 Nicole Bilderback (born 1975), actress
 Francelia Billington (1895–1934), actress in silent films
 Gil Birmingham (born 1966), actor, Billy Black in The Twilight Saga
 Dustin Lance Black (born 1979), Academy Award-winning screenwriter, director, producer
 Patricia Blair (1933–2013), actress, Daniel Boone, The Rifleman, The Electric Horseman
 Justin Blanchard (born 1980), actor
 Alexis Bledel (born 1981), actress, starred in Gilmore Girls
 Dan Blocker (1928–1972), actor, played Hoss Cartwright on Bonanza
 Joan Blondell (1906–1979), Academy Award-nominated actress
 Don Bluth (born 1937), animator, studio owner, An American Tail, The Land Before Time
 Larry Blyden (1925–1975), actor, game-show host
 Virginia True Boardman (1889–1971), silent-era film actress
 Spencer Boldman (born 1992), actor
 John Boles (1895–1969), actor
 Tiffany Bolton (born 1971), actress, model, talk-show host
 Matthew Bomer (born 1977), actor, Tru Calling, White Collar
 Kevin Booth (born 1961), film director, producer, lecturer, musician
 Powers Boothe (1948–2017), actor, Deadwood, Tombstone, Southern Comfort
 Jesse Borrego (born 1962), actor, Fame, 24, Dexter
 Michael Bowen (born 1953), actor, Jackie Brown, Magnolia, Lost
 Rob Bowman (born 1960), film and television director, The X-Files, Star Trek: The Next Generation
 Lombardo Boyar (born 1973), actor, The Bernie Mac Show
 Richard Bradford (1934–2016), actor, Man in a Suitcase, The Untouchables
 Abby Brammell (born 1979), actress, played Tiffy Gerhardt on The Unit
 Larry Brantley (born 1966), voice actor, comedian, radio spokesman
 Eve Brent (1929–2011), actress
 Mary Brian (1906–2002), actress
 James Brown (1920–1992), actor, The Adventures of Rin Tin Tin
 Tammie Brown (born 1980), actor, drag queen, musician
 Larry Buchanan (1923–2004), film director, producer, writer
 Samantha Buck (born 1974), actress, Law & Order: Criminal Intent
 Betty Buckley (born 1947), film and Tony Award-winning stage actress, singer
 Norman Buckley (born 1955), television director and editor
 Dennis Burkley (1945–2013), actor
 Carol Burnett (born 1933), actress, comedian, The Carol Burnett Show
 Demi Burnett (born 1995), reality-television personality
 Brooke Burns (born 1978), actress, model
 Burnie Burns (born 1973), writer, actor, producer, comedian, host, director
 Marilyn Burns (1949–2014), actress, starred in The Texas Chain Saw Massacre (1974)
 Wendell Burton (1947–2017), actor, The Sterile Cuckoo
 Gary Busey (born 1944), Academy Award-nominated actor, The Buddy Holly Story, Under Siege
 Tom Byron (born 1961), adult film actor, director, producer

 C

 Kevin Cahoon (born 1971), actor, director, singer-songwriter
 Bill Camfield (1929–1991), radio and television host, writer, comedian
 Kate Capshaw (born 1953), actress, married to Steven Spielberg
 Gina Carano (born 1982), actress, television personality, mixed martial arts fighter
 Steve Cardenas (born 1974), martial artist and retired actor, Mighty Morphin Power Rangers, Power Rangers: Zeo
 Edwin Carewe (1883–1940), film director, actor, producer, writer
 Thomas Carter (born 1953), director, actor
 Allen Case (1934–1986), actor, singer
 John L. Cason (1918–1961), actor
 Don Castle (1917–1966), actor
 Darlene Cates (1947–2017), actress
 Derek Cecil (born 1973), actor, House of Cards
 Miguel Cervantes (born 1977), actor
 Duane Lee Chapman, II (born 1973), Dog the Bounty Hunter
 Leland Chapman (born 1976), Dog the Bounty Hunter
 Cyd Charisse (1922–2008), actress, dancer, Singin' in the Rain, The Band Wagon
 Ricardo Chavira (born 1971), actor, played Carlos Soli on Desperate Housewives
 Lois Chiles (born 1947), actress, model, Moonraker, The Great Gatsby, Broadcast News
 Thomas Haden Church (born 1961), Academy Award-nominated actor, Sideways, Spider-Man 3, All About Steve
 Victoria Clark (born 1959), Tony Award-winning actress, singer
 Jack Clay (1926–2019), acting teacher, actor, director
 Taylor Cole (born 1984), actress/model, Summerland, The Event
 Dabney Coleman (born 1932), actor, Buffalo Bill, 9 to 5, The Towering Inferno, Tootsie
 Jessica Collins (born 1983), actress, played Maggie on Rubicon
 Lynn Collins (born 1979), actress, X-Men Origins: Wolverine
 Marcus Collins (born 1974), actor, singer
 Shanna Collins (born 1983), actress, Swingtown
 Ellar Coltrane (born 1994), actor
 Chris Cooper (born 1951), actor; winner, Academy Award for Best Supporting Actor, Adaptation, Seabiscuit, The Bourne Identity, The Patriot, The Muppets
 Tamarie Cooper (born 1970), actress, playwright
 Barry Corbin (born 1940), actor, Urban Cowboy, Nothing in Common, Who's Harry Crumb?
 Alex Cord (1933–2021), actor, Airwolf, rancher
 Allen Coulter (born 1969), film and television director, The Sopranos
 Ashley Cox (born 1956), actress, model
 David Crabb (born 1975), actor
 Yvonne Craig (1937–2015), actress
 Norma Crane (1928–1973), actress, Fiddler on the Roof
 Chace Crawford (born 1985), actor
 Joan Crawford (1908–1977), Academy Award-winning actress, Mildred Pierce, Johnny Guitar, What Ever Happened to Baby Jane?
 Catherine Crier (born 1954), television personality, judge
 Kathryn Crosby (born 1933), actress, Anatomy of a Murder, wife of Bing Crosby
 Shauna Cross (born 1974), screenwriter, author, roller derby athlete
 Brett Cullen (born 1956), actor, The Young Riders, Legacy, Ghost Rider
 Erin Cummings (born 1977), actress, Detroit 1-8-7
 Bonnie Curtis (born 1966), film producer

 D–E

 Tony Dalton (born 1975), actor, played Lalo Salamanca on Better Call Saul
 Diana Danielle (born 1991), Malaysian actress, born in Houston
 Bebe Daniels (1901–1971), actress, singer, dancer, writer, producer
 Linda Darnell (1923–1965), actress, Forever Amber, A Letter to Three Wives
 Jim Dauterive (born 1957), producer and writer, King of the Hill
 Kennedy Davenport (Reuben Asberry Jr.) (born 1982), television personality, drag queen, dancer
 Madison Davenport (born 1996), actress
 Phyllis Davis (1940–2013), actress
 Eddie Dean (1907–1999), singer-songwriter, actor
 Lezlie Deane (born 1964), actress, singer
 Marjorie Deanne (1917–1994), actress, first winner of Miss Texas pageant
 Alana de la Garza (born 1976), actress, Law & Order, CSI: Miami, The Mountain
 Madison De La Garza (born 2001), teen actress, Desperate Housewives
 Bob Denver (1935–2005), actor, played Maynard G. Krebs in Dobie Gillis and title role in Gilligan's Island
 Elizabeth De Razzo (born 1980), actress, played Maria on Eastbound & Down
 Kaitlyn Dever (born 1996), teen actress, Last Man Standing, Justified
 Loretta Devine (born 1949), actress, Waiting to Exhale, Grey's Anatomy
 Dorothy Devore (1899–1976), actress, comedian
 Jenna Dewan (born 1980), actress, star of Step Up and Take the Lead
 Elliott Dexter (1870–1941), actor
 Shae D'lyn (born 1962), actress, Dharma and Greg
 Frank Q. Dobbs (1939–2006), screenwriter, director, producer
 Chris Donahue (born 1958), Academy Award-winning film producer
 Colby Donaldson (born 1974), actor
 Michael Dorn (born 1952), star of Star Trek: The Next Generation and Star Trek: Deep Space Nine
 Jessica Drake (born 1974), porn star
 Haylie Duff (born 1985), actress
 Hilary Duff (born 1987), actress, singer
 Karen Dufilho-Rosen (born 1968), Academy Award-winning film producer
 Josh Duhon (born 1982), actor, played Logan Hayes on General Hospital
 Donnie Dunagan (born 1934), actor, voice actor
 Sandy Duncan (born 1946), actress, singer, The Sandy Duncan Show, The Hogan Family
 Kenton Duty (born 1995), teen actor, Shake It Up, Ctrl
 Shelley Duvall (born 1949), actress, The Shining, Annie Hall, Olive Oyl in film Popeye
 George Eads (born 1967), actor, plays Nick Stokes in television series CSI
 Greg Edmonson, music composer for television, movies and video games, King of the Hill, Firefly
 Ike Eisenmann (born 1962), actor, producer
 Shannon Elizabeth (born 1973), actress, American Pie
 Chris Elley (born 1977), film director, writer, producer
 Chris Ellis (born 1956), actor
 Ron Ely (born 1938), actor, Tarzan
 Mireille Enos (born 1975), actress
 Molly Erdman (born 1974), actress
 Bill Erwin (1914–2010), character actor
 Dale Evans (1912–2001), actress, singer-songwriter, married to Roy Rogers

 F–G

 Morgan Fairchild (born 1950), actress in Dallas television series (one of three actresses to play character "Jenna Wade") and Flamingo Road
 Parisa Fakhri (born 1975), voice actress, Dragon Ball GT, Fruits Basket
 Amy Farrington (born 1966), actress
 Farrah Fawcett (1947–2009), actress and artist, Charlie's Angels, The Burning Bed, Extremities, The Apostle
 Katie Featherston (born 1982), actress, Paranormal Activity
 Jay R. Ferguson (born 1974), actor
 Rosita Fernandez (1919–2006), actress, pop singer
 Tyra Ferrell (born 1962), actress, The Cape, City, The Bronx Zoo
 Margaret Field (1922–2011), actress, mother of actress Sally Field
 Miles Fisher (born 1983), actor
 Sean Patrick Flanery (born 1965), actor, The Boondock Saints
 Horton Foote (1916–2009), two-time Academy Award-winning screenwriter
 Michelle Forbes (born 1965), actress, Homicide: Life on the Street, 24, True Blood
 Tom Forman (1893–1926), actor, writer, producer
 Steve Forrest (1925–2013), actor, So Big, Mommie Dearest, North Dallas Forty
 Robert Foxworth (born 1941), actor, Falcon Crest, Six Feet Under
 Jamie Foxx (born 1967), Academy Award-winning actor, Ray, Any Given Sunday, Django Unchained
 James Frawley (1936–2019), director, actor, producer
 Gavin Free (born 1988), video cinematographer
 Al Freeman Jr. (1934–2012), actor, director, Finian's Rainbow, Malcolm X
 K. Todd Freeman (born 1965), actor
 Augustine Frizzell (born 1979), actress, director, screenwriter
 Robert Fuller (born 1933), actor, rancher
 Chris Furrh (born 1974), actor
 Jennifer Garner (born 1972), actress, 13 Going on 30, Dallas Buyers Club, Draft Day, television series Alias
 Joy Garrett (1945–1993), actress, singer
 Greer Garson (1904–1996), Academy Award-winning actress
 Nancy Gates (1926–2019), actress
 Lynda Day George (born 1944), actress, television series Mission: Impossible
 Richard Gilliland (1950–2021), actor
 Peri Gilpin (born 1961), actress, Frasier
 Michael Gladis (born 1977), actor, Mad Men, Eagleheart
 Lesli Linka Glatter (born 1953), film director
 Summer Glau (born 1981), dancer and actress, Firefly
 Carlin Glynn (born 1940), actress, singer
 Dale Godboldo (born 1975), actor
 Renée Elise Goldsberry (born 1971), actress, singer-songwriter
 Mike Gomez (born 1951), actor
 Selena Gomez (born 1992), actress and singer, formed band Selena Gomez & The Scene
 Nicholas Gonzalez (born 1976), actor
 Pedro Gonzalez-Gonzalez (1925–2006), character actor
 Jill Goodacre (born 1965), actress, model
 YaYa Gosselin (born 2009), actress
 Mckenna Grace (born 2006), actress
 Brea Grant (born 1981), actress, played Daphne Millbrook on Heroes
 Teresa Graves (1948–2002), actress
 David Gordon Green (born 1975), filmmaker
 John Gremillion (born 1967), voice actor
 Nan Grey (1918–1993), actress
 Corinne Griffith (1894–1979), actress
 Kristin Griffith (born 1953), actress
 Texas Guinan (1884–1933), actress, singer, entrepreneur
 Tim Guinee (born 1962), actor
 Anne Gwynne (1918–2003), actress

 H

 Tommy Habeeb (born 1958), actor, writer, producer
 Sara Haden (1899–1981), actress
 Reed Hadley (1911–1974), actor, Racket Squad
 Sarah Hagan (born 1984), actress
 Emily Hagins (born 1992), film producer, writer, editor, director
 Larry Hagman (1931–2012), actor, I Dream of Jeannie, Dallas, son of actress Mary Martin
 Monte Hale (1919–2009), actor, country singer
 Jackie Earle Haley (born 1961), Academy Award-nominated actor, The Bad News Bears, Breaking Away, Little Children
 Bug Hall (born 1985), actor
 Irma P. Hall (born 1935), actress
 James Hall (1900–1940), actor
 Jerry Hall (born 1956), model, actress, former wife of Mick Jagger
 Hope Hampton (1897–1982), actress in silent films
 John Lee Hancock (born 1956), film director, The Blind Side
 Gunnar Hansen (1947–2015), actor, The Texas Chain Saw Massacre
 Marcy Hanson (born 1952), actress, Playboy model
 Jerry Hardin (born 1929), actor
 Melora Hardin (born 1967), actress
 Ty Hardin (1930–2017), actor
 Ann Harding (1903–1981), actress
 Catherine Hardwicke (born 1955), film director, Twilight
 Mark Harelik (born 1951), actor, playwright
 Angie Harmon (born 1972), actress, Law & Order, Rizzoli & Isles
 William Jackson Harper (born 1980), actor
 James N. Harrell (1918–2000), actor
 Woody Harrelson (born 1961), actor, Cheers, Natural Born Killers, White Men Can't Jump, No Country for Old Men, True Detective
 Laura Harring (born 1964), actress, Mulholland Drive
 Fran Harris (born 1965), television host, life coach, professional basketball player
 Harriet Sansom Harris (born 1955), actress, Desperate Housewives, Frasier, It's All Relative, The 5 Mrs. Buchanans
 Chris Harrison (born 1971), television announcer
 James V. Hart (born 1960), screenwriter
 Lisa Hartman-Black (born 1956), actress, Knots Landing
 Ethan Hawke (born 1970), actor, Training Day, Before Midnight, Dead Poets Society
 John Hawkes (born 1959), Academy Award-nominated actor, Winter's Bone, Deadwood, The Sessions
 Brad Hawkins (born 1976), actor, VR Troopers
 Jerry Haynes (1927–2011), actor, children's television host
 Ted Healy (1896–1937), vaudeville performer, comedian, actor; created The Three Stooges
 Amber Heard (born 1986), actress, Friday Night Lights, Pineapple Express, Drive Angry
 Rick Hearst (born 1965), actor
 Katherine Helmond (1929–2019), actress, Soap
 Sherman Hemsley (1938–2012), actor, The Jeffersons, adopted El Paso as his hometown
 Josh Henderson (born 1981), actor, model, singer, Dallas, Desperate Housewives, Over There
 Logan Henderson (born 1989), actor and singer
 Tiffany Hendra (born 1971), actress, television personality
 Kim Henkel (born 1946), screenwriter, director, producer, actor
 Bill "Tex" Henson (1924–2002), animator
 Stephen Herek (born 1958), film director, 101 Dalmatians
 Jennifer Love Hewitt (born 1979), actress, Ghost Whisperer, The Client List
 Tamara Hext (born 1963), actress, winner of Miss Texas pageant
 Joel Heyman (born 1971), actor
 John Benjamin Hickey (born 1963), actor, It's All Relative, The Big C
 John Hillerman (1932–2017), actor, played English Major domo Higgins on Magnum, P.I.
 Jordan Hinson (born 1991), actress
 Junie Hoang (born 1971), actress and plaintiff in Hoang v. Amazon.com
 Gregory Hoblit (born 1944), television and film director
 Tommy Hollis (1954–2001), actor
 Charlene Holt (1928–1996), actress
 Tobe Hooper (1943–2017), director The Texas Chain Saw Massacre, Poltergeist, Salem's Lot
 William Hootkins (1948–2005), actor, Batman, Raiders of the Lost Ark, Star Wars
 Roger Horchow (1928–2020), Broadway producer, catalog entrepreneur 
 Lee Horsley (born 1955), actor, Matt Houston
 Larry Hovis (1936–2003), actor, Hogan's Heroes
 Susan Howard (born 1944), born in Marshall, longtime actress in Dallas television series
 Matt Hullum (born 1974), director, producer, writer, actor, visual effects supervisor
 Gayle Hunnicutt (born 1943), actress, Marlowe, The Legend of Hell House
 Paige Hurd (born 1992), actress, Everybody Hates Chris
 Tracy Hutson (born 1986), reality television personality
 Martha Hyer (1924–2014), Academy Award-nominated actress, Some Came Running, The Carpetbaggers, The Sons of Katie Elder

 I–J

 Judith Ivey (born 1951), film and Tony Award-winning stage actress, director
 John M. Jackson (born 1950), actor, played Rear Admiral A. J. Chegwidden on JAG
 Gary Jacobs (born 1952), television comedy writer, producer, author
 Dorothy Janis (1912–2010), actress in silent films
 Annalee Jefferies (born 1954), actress
 Rita Jenrette (born 1949), actress, television journalist, real-estate executive, model, princess
 Chane't Johnson (1976–2010), actress
 Dakota Johnson (born 1989), actress
 Janelle Johnson (1923–1995), actress; mother of The Monkees' Micky Dolenz
 Sandy Johnson (born 1954), actress, model
 Joe Johnston (born 1950), film director, Jumanji, Jurassic Park III, Captain America: The First Avenger
 Terra Jolé (born 1980), reality TV personality
 Nick Jonas (born 1992), singer, actor
 Alex Jones (born 1974), radio host, television host, film producer
 Angus T. Jones (born 1993), actor, Jake Harper on Two and a Half Men
 Ashley Jones (born 1976), actress, The Bold and the Beautiful, The Young and the Restless
 Caleb Landry Jones (born 1989), actor
 Carolyn Jones (1929–1983), actress, played Morticia Addams on The Addams Family
 Dick Jones (1927–2014), actor, starring role of Buffalo Bill, Jr. and voice of Pinocchio
 L. Q. Jones (1927–2022), actor, The Wild Bunch, Casino, originally from Beaumont
 Margo Jones (1911–1955), theatre founder and director
 Mickey Jones (1941–2018), actor, musician, Home Improvement, Flo
 Preston Jones (1936–1979), playwright, actor, director
 Preston Jones (born 1983), actor
 Tommy Lee Jones (born 1946), Academy Award-winning actor, The Fugitive, Men in Black, Batman Forever, No Country for Old Men, Lincoln
 Glenn Jordan (born 1936), television director, producer
 Montana Jordan (born 2003), actor
 Jonathan Joss (born 1965), actor
 Mike Judge (born 1962), producer, animator and actor

 K–L

 Joseph Kahn (born 1972), music video, advertising, and feature film director
 Christian Kane (born 1974), actor, singer, played "Lindsay" on Angel, Close to Home
 Jon Keeyes (born 1969), film director, producer, screenwriter
 Allison Keith (born 1974), actor, voice actor
 Evelyn Keyes (1916–2008), actress, Gone With the Wind
 Callie Khouri (born 1957), Academy Award-winning screenwriter, director
 Guy Kibbee (1882–1956), actor
 Candice King (born 1987), actress best known as Caroline Forbes on The Vampire Diaries
 Charles King (1895–1957), actor
 Liza Koshy (born 1996), actress, internet personality
 Bernard L. Kowalski (1929–2007), film and television director
 Berry Kroeger (1912–1991), actor
 Eric Ladin (born 1978), actor, The Killing
 Christine Lakin (born 1979), actress, Step by Step, Valentine's Day
 Paul Lambert (1922–1997), actor
 Sasha Lane (born 1995), actress
 Wallace Langham (born 1965), actor, CSI: Crime Scene Investigation, The Larry Sanders Show, Veronica's Closet
 Brooke Langton (born 1970), actress
 Louise Latham (1922–2018), actress
 Jody Lawrance (1930–1986), actress
 Sheryl Leach (born 1952), creator of children's programming (Barney & Friends)
 Katie Leclerc (born 1986), actress
 Ruta Lee (born 1936), actress
 Cherami Leigh (born 1988), actress
 Brad Leland (born 1954), actor, Friday Night Lights
 Joshua Leonard (born 1975), actor, writer, director
 Hal LeSueur (1901?–1963), actor; brother of Joan Crawford
 Liana Liberato (born 1995), actress
 Lar Park Lincoln (born 1961), actress
 Amy Lindsay (born 1966), actress
 Rachel Lindsay (born 1985), reality television star, The Bachelorette
 Richard Lineback (born 1952), actor
 Richard Linklater (born 1961), director Slacker, Dazed and Confused, Before Sunrise, School of Rock, A Scanner Darkly
 Cody Linley (born 1989), actor, rapper, singer
 Lucien Littlefield (1895–1960), actor in silent films
 Tembi Locke (born 1970), actress, Eureka, Sliders
 Jacqueline Logan (1901–1983), actress in silent films
 Joshua Logan (1908–1988), stage and film director
 Eva Longoria (born 1975), actress, Desperate Housewives
 Trini Lopez (1937–2020), singer and actor, The Dirty Dozen
 Demi Lovato (born 1992), singer, actress
 Bessie Love (1898–1986), actress
 Deirdre Lovejoy (born 1962), actress, Rhonda Pearlman on The Wire
 Todd Lowe (born 1977), actor
 Shannon Lucio (born 1980), actress
 Allen Ludden (1917–1981), emcee, game show host
 Baruch Lumet (1898–1992), theatre actor, director, teacher

 M

 Donald MacDonald (1898–1959), actor
 Lydia Mackay (born 1977), voice actress
 Peter MacNicol (born 1954), Emmy Award-winning actor, Ally McBeal, Chicago Hope, Sophie's Choice
 Meredith MacRae (1944–2000), actress, Petticoat Junction
 Martha Madison (born 1977), actress
 Valerie Mahaffey (born 1953), actress
 Terrence Malick (born 1943), director Badlands, Days of Heaven, The Thin Red Line
 Kym Malin (born 1962), actress, model
 Irlene Mandrell (born 1956), actress, model
 David Mann (born 1966), actor, singer
 Tamela Mann (born 1966), actress, singer
 Stephanie March (born 1974), actress, Law & Order: Special Victims Unit
 Amelia Marshall (born 1958), actress
 Mary Martin (1913–1990), Emmy Award- and Tony Award-winning actress, mother of actor Larry Hagman
 Steve Martin (born 1945), actor, The Jerk, Pennies from Heaven, Three Amigos, Planes, Trains and Automobiles, Father of the Bride, Parenthood, The Pink Panther
 Margo Martindale (born 1951), actress, The Riches, 100 Centre Street, The Millers
 Peter Masterson (1934–2018), actor, director, producer, writer
 Kimberly Matula (born 1988), actress
 Brad Maule (born 1951), actor
 Adam Mayfield (born 1976), actor
 Peter Mayhew (1944–2019), actor
 Tim McCanlies (born 1963), screenwriter, director
 Cameron McCasland (born 1981), filmmaker
 Mart McChesney (1954–1999), actor
 Matthew McConaughey (born 1969), Academy Award-winning actor, Dallas Buyers Club, A Time to Kill, The Lincoln Lawyer, Contact, Magic Mike, True Detective
 Carolyn McCormick (born 1959), actress, played Dr. Liz Olivet on Law & Order
 Jake McDorman (born 1986), actor
 Spanky McFarland (1928–1993), actor, played "Spanky" in the Our Gang comedies, aka The Little Rascals
 Bruce McGill (born 1950), actor, Animal House, The Legend of Bagger Vance, 61*, Lincoln
 Jay McGraw (born 1979), television producer and executive producer, author
 Kevin McHale (born 1988), actor
 Ben McKenzie (born 1978), actor, The O.C.
 Alex McLeod (born 1968), actress
 Scoot McNairy (born 1977), actor, producer, Halt and Catch Fire, 12 Years a Slave, Argo
 Terrence McNally (1939–2020), playwright
 William McNamara (born 1965), actor
 Leighton Meester (born 1986), actress, Gossip Girl
 Windell Middlebrooks (1979–2015), actor
 Liz Mikel (born 1963), actress, singer
 Ann Miller (1923–2004), actress, dancer
 Austin Miller (born 1976), actor, dancer, singer
 Billy Miller (born 1979), actor, The Young and the Restless, All My Children
 Carl Miller (1893–1979), actor
 Logan Miller (born 1992), actor, musician
 McKaley Miller (born 1996), actress, Hart of Dixie, Partners
 Valarie Rae Miller (born 1974), actress
 Don Mischer (born 1940), television producer, director
 Elizabeth Mitchell (born 1970), actress, Lost, V, ER
 Tom Mix (1880–1940), silent film actor
 Roger Mobley (born 1949), child actor, Christian pastor
 DeQuina Moore (born 1986), actress
 Belita Moreno (born 1949), actress
 Glenn Morshower (born 1959), actor, Agent Aaron Pierce on 24
 Michael Muhney (born 1975), actor
 Mitchel Musso (born 1991), actor, singer, musician
 Megan Mylan (born 1969), Academy Award-winning documentary filmmaker

 N–P

 Jack Nance (1943–1996), actor
 Edwin Neal (born 1945), actor
 Tracey Needham (born 1967), actress, Life Goes On, JAG, The Division
 Pola Negri (1897–1987), silent film actress
 Austin Nichols (born 1980), actor, Julian Baker on One Tree Hill
 Derek Lee Nixon (born 1983), actor
 James Noble (1922–2016), actor, Benson
 Timothy Nolen (born 1941), Broadway actor/singer, opera singer
 Chuck Norris, actor, Walker, Texas Ranger
 Renee O'Connor (born 1971), actress
 John Baker "Texas Jack" Omohundro (1846–1880), actor, cowboy, frontier scout
 Ty O'Neal (born 1978), actor
 Lupe Ontiveros (1942–2012), actress
 Hayley Orrantia (born 1994), singer, actress, The Goldbergs
 Peter Ostrum (born 1957), veterinarian, former child actor, Willy Wonka & the Chocolate Factory
 Annette O'Toole (born 1955), actress, Superman III, Smallville
 Dan Hewitt Owens (born 1947), actor
 Lee Pace (born 1979), actor
 Jared Padalecki (born 1982), actor, Gilmore Girls, Supernatural
 Kevin Page (born 1959), actor, artist
 Greg Pak (born 1968), film director, comic-book writer
 Kay Panabaker (born 1990), television actress
 Fess Parker (1924–2010), actor, Daniel Boone, Mr. Smith Goes to Washington, Old Yeller
 Kathryn O'Rourke Parker (born 1948), television producer
 Suzy Parker (1932–2003), actress, model
 Hunter Parrish (born 1987), actor, Weeds
 Jim Parsons (born 1973), Emmy Award-winning actor, The Big Bang Theory
 Paul A. Partain (1946–2005), actor
 Tayla Parx (born 1993), actress
 Pedro Pascal (born 1975), actor
 Eric Patrick, filmmaker, animator, educator
 Hank Patterson (1888–1975), actor
 Bill Paxton (1955–2017), actor and director, Titanic, Apollo 13, Twister, Big Love
 Mark Payne (born 1965), make-up artist, filmmaker, author
 Evelyn Peirce (1908–1960), actress
 Eagle Pennell (1952–2002), film director
 Channing Godfrey Peoples (born 1977), writer, director, producer
 Jack Pepper (1902–1979), vaudeville dancer, singer, comedian, actor, nightclub manager; first husband of Ginger Rogers
 Piper Perabo (born 1976), actress, Covert Affairs, The Prestige, Looper, Coyote Ugly
 Marco Perella (born 1949), actor
 Valerie Perrine (born 1943), Academy Award-nominated actress, Lenny, The Electric Horseman, Superman
 Lou Perryman (1941–2009), actor
 Madison Pettis (born 1998), actress
 Cindy Pickett (born 1947), actress, St. Elsewhere, Ferris Bueller's Day Off
 Arthur C. Pierce (1923–1987), screenwriter, film director
 Mary Kay Place (born 1947), actress, Mary Hartman, Mary Hartman, The Big Chill, John Grisham's The Rainmaker
 Jesse Plemons (born 1988), actor
 Esteban Powell (born 1976), actor
 Joan Prather (born 1950), actress
 Ann Prentiss (1939–2010), actress
 Paula Prentiss (born 1938), actress, What's New Pussycat?, Where the Boys Are, Catch-22, The Stepford Wives
 Missi Pyle (born 1972), actress, singer, Charlie and the Chocolate Factory, DodgeBall

 Q–R

 Dennis Quaid (born 1954), actor, Breaking Away, The Right Stuff, The Big Easy, Wyatt Earp, Everybody's All-American, Any Given Sunday
 Randy Quaid (born 1950), actor, The Last Picture Show, The Last Detail, National Lampoon's Vacation, Brokeback Mountain
 Molly Quinn (born 1993), actress, We're the Millers, Castle, Winx Club
 Kevin Rahm (born 1971), actor, Judging Amy, Desperate Housewives, Mad Men, Jesse
 Steve Railsback (born 1945), actor, Helter Skelter, The Stunt Man
 Dominic Rains (born 1982), actor
 Ethan Rains (born 1981), actor
 Sendhil Ramamurthy (born 1974), actor, Mohinder Suresh on Heroes
 Haley Ramm (born 1992), actress
 Ben Rappaport (born 1986), actor, Outsourced
 Phylicia Rashād (born 1948), actress, The Cosby Show
 Jackson Rathbone (born 1984), actor, musician
 Richard Rawlings (born 1969), reality-television star (Fast N' Loud), entrepreneur, auto mechanic, race car driver
 Allene Ray (1901–1979), actress
 Arthur Redcloud, actor
 Debbie Reynolds (1932–2016), Academy Award-nominated actress and singer, Singin' in the Rain, The Unsinkable Molly Brown, How the West Was Won, Mother, mother of Carrie Fisher
 Kevin Reynolds (born 1952), screenwriter, director, Robin Hood: Prince of Thieves, Red Dawn
 Patricia Richardson (born 1951), actress, Jill Taylor on Home Improvement
 Shannon Richardson (born 1977), actress
 Noah Ringer (born 1998), actor
 Carlos Rivas (1925–2003), actor
 Emilio Rivera (born 1961), actor, Marcus Álvarez on Sons of Anarchy
 Dallas Roberts (born 1970), actor
 Gene Roddenberry (1921–1991), Star Trek creator, writer, director, producer
 Rod Roddy (1937–2003), radio and television announcer
 Holland Roden (born 1986), actress, Teen Wolf
 James Roday Rodriguez (born 1976), actor
 Michelle Rodriguez (born 1978), actress, Lost
 Raini Rodriguez (born 1993), actress, Paul Blart: Mall Cop
 Rico Rodriguez (born 1998), teen actor, Modern Family
 Robert Rodriguez (born 1968), director, producer, writer, composer
 Ginger Rogers (1911–1995), Academy Award-winning actress, singer, dancer
 Kylie Rogers (born 2004), child actress, The Whispers, Collateral Beauty, Miracles from Heaven
 Henry Roquemore (1886–1943), actor
 Thomas Rosales Jr. (born 1948), stunt man
 Ross Sisters, Betsy (1926–1996), Vickie (1927–2002), and Dixie (1929–1963), Broadway singers, dancers, contortionists
 Brad Rushing (born 1964), cinematographer
 Debby Ryan (born 1993), actress, singer, voice actress
 Irene Ryan (1902–1973), actress, "Granny" on The Beverly Hillbillies
 Melissa Rycroft (born 1983), reality television contestant

 S

 Mark Salling (1982–2018), actor
 Ajai Sanders (born 1967), actress, comedian
 Jay O. Sanders (born 1953), actor, Crime Story, AfterMASH, The Day After Tomorrow
 Stark Sands (born 1978), actor
 John Phillip Santos (born 1957), filmmaker, producer, journalist, author
 August Schellenberg (1936–2013), actor
 Robert Schenkkan (born 1953), actor, playwright, screenwriter
 Thomas Schlamme (born 1950), producer, director
 Julian Schnabel (born 1951), award-winning film director, visual artist
 Maïté Schwartz (born 1979), actress
 Tracy Scoggins (born 1953), actress, The Colbys, Lois & Clark, Babylon 5
 Kimberly Scott (born 1961), actress
 Zachary Scott (1914–1965), actor, Mildred Pierce, Cass Timberlane
 Edward Sedgwick (1892–1953), film director, writer, actor, producer
 Eileen Sedgwick (1898–1991), actress in silent films
 Joan Severance (born 1958), actress, model
 Sarah Shahi (born 1980), actress, Life, Fairly Legal, The L Word
 Shangela, drag queen, reality television personality
 Andrew Shapter (born 1966), film director, producer, writer, photographer
 Karen Sharpe (born 1934), actress, The High and the Mighty
 Ann Sheridan (1915–1967), actress, The Man Who Came to Dinner, Kings Row
 Taylor Sheridan (born 1970), filmmaker, actor
 Jim Siedow (1920–2003), actor
 Trinidad Silva (1950–1988), actor
 Justin Simien (born 1983), filmmaker, actor, author
 Johnny Simmons (born 1986), actor
 Lori Singer (born 1957), actress, model, classical musician
 Marc Singer (born 1948), actor, Michael Donovan on V: The Original Miniseries, V: The Final Battle, and V: The Series
 Guru Singh (born 1980), actor
 J. Mack Slaughter Jr. (born 1983), actor
 Brian J. Smith (born 1981), actor, Stargate Universe, Sense8
 Bubba Smith (1945–2011), actor, professional football player
 Jaclyn Smith (born 1947), actress, starred in Charlie's Angels
 Kimberly Kay Smith (born 1983), model, actress
 Gus Sorola (born 1978), actor, podcast host
 Eve Southern (1898–1972), actress
 Sissy Spacek (born 1949), Academy Award-winning actress, Coal Miner's Daughter, Carrie, Missing, cousin of Rip Torn
 Merrie Spaeth (born 1948), child and teen actress; now a business and political consultant and educator
 Aaron Spelling (1923–2006), television producer
 Georgina Spelvin (born 1936), adult film actress
 Brent Spiner (born 1949), actor, star of Star Trek: The Next Generation
 Kim Spradlin (born 1983), reality television personality, interior designer, business owner
 Andy Stahl (born 1952), actor, The Client, The Patriot, The Blind Side
 Nick Stahl (born 1979), actor, Sin City, The Man Without a Face, Terminator 3: Rise of the Machines
 Jimmy Starr (1904–1991), screenwriter, columnist
 Jack Starrett (1936–1989), actor, director
 Eddie Steeples (born 1973), actor
 Jennifer Stone (born 1993), actress
 Matt Stone (born 1971), animator, voice actor, cocreator of South Park with Trey Parker
 Gale Storm (1922–2009), actress, singer
 Glenn Strange (1899–1973), actor
 Sherry Stringfield (born 1967), actress
 David Sullivan (born 1977), actor
 Allison Sumrall (born 1979), voice actress
 Don Swayze (born 1958), actor
 Patrick Swayze (1952–2009), actor, Dirty Dancing, The Outsiders, Road House, Ghost
 Madylin Sweeten (born 1991), actress, Everybody Loves Raymond
 Clarence Swensen (1917–2009), actor
 Francie Swift (born 1968), actress, Gossip Girl

 T–U

 Ralph Tabakin (1921–2001), actor, Homicide: Life on the Street
 Margaret Tallichet (1914–1991), actress
 Sharon Tate (1943–1969), actress, Valley of the Dolls
 Regina Taylor (born 1960), actress, Molly Blane on The Unit; playwright
 Ron Taylor (1952–2002), actor
 Henry Thomas (born 1971), actor, E.T. the Extra-Terrestrial, Gangs of New York, All the Pretty Horses
 Jay Thomas (1948–2017), actor, Mr. Holland's Opus, Cheers
 Tiffany Thornton (born 1986), actress
 Stephen Tobolowsky (born 1951), actor, Bob Bishop on Heroes, Ned Ryerson in Groundhog Day
 Rip Torn (1931–2019), Academy Award-nominated actor, Cross Creek, Sweet Bird of Youth, The Cincinnati Kid, Defending Your Life, The Larry Sanders Show, cousin of Sissy Spacek
 Stacey Travis (born 1964), actress
 Jesús Salvador Treviño (born 1946), television director
 Barry Tubb (born 1963), actor, director
 Alan Tudyk (born 1971), actor
 Tommy Tune (born 1939), dancer, actor, Broadway director, choreographer
 Paola Turbay (born 1970), actress, model, The Secret Life of the American Teenager, Cane
 Janine Turner (born 1962), model, actress, author, radio talk show host
 Karri Turner (born 1966), actress
 Maidel Turner (1888–1953), film actress
 Meg Turney (born 1987), internet personality, cosplayer, model, vlogger
 Michael Urie (born 1980), actor, Ugly Betty

 V–Z

 Brenda Vaccaro (born 1939), Academy Award-nominated actress, Once Is Not Enough, Midnight Cowboy, Airport '77
 Jack Valenti (1921–2007), president of the Motion Picture Association of America (MPAA), 1966–2004; special assistant to U.S. President Lyndon B. Johnson
 Greg Vaughan (born 1973), actor, former fashion model, General Hospital, Days of Our Lives, Charmed
 Conrad Vernon (born 1968), voice actor, writer, director, the Shrek movies, the Madagascar movies, Monsters vs. Aliens
 Florence Vidor (1895–1977), actress
 King Vidor (1894–1982), film director, producer
 Libby Villari (born 1951), actress
 Tom Virtue (born 1957), actor, Even Stevens, Blades of Glory
 Elda Voelkel (1911–2001), actress; later documentary filmmaker (as Elda Hartley)
 Lenny Von Dohlen (born 1958), actor
 Helen Wagner (1918–2010), actress, played Nancy Hughes on As the World Turns for 54 years
 Charlotte Walker (1876–1958), actress
 Jordan Wall (born 1981), actor
 Isaiah Washington (born 1963), actor, Dr. Preston Burke on Grey's Anatomy
 Barry Watson (born 1974), actor
 Ann Wedgeworth (1934–2017), actress, Lana on Three's Company
 Debbie Weems (1950–1978), actress, singer, Captain Kangaroo
 Peter Weller (born 1947), actor, RoboCop, Star Trek Into Darkness
 Noël Wells (born 1986), actress, comedian
 Bob West (born 1956), actor, Barney & Friends
 Margaret West (1903–1963), vaudeville performer, radio hostess, heiress
 Lisa Whelchel (born 1963), actress, author
 Forest Whitaker (born 1961), Academy Award-winning actor and director, The Last King of Scotland, Bird, Good Morning, Vietnam, Panic Room, Lee Daniels' The Butler
 Johnny Whitworth (born 1975), actor, CSI: Miami
 Caroline Williams (born 1957), actress
 Guinn Williams (1899–1962), actor
 JoBeth Williams (born 1948), actress, Poltergeist, The Big Chill, Screen Actors Guild president
 Ryan Piers Williams (born 1981), actor, director, writer
 Van Williams (1934–2016), actor
 Noble Willingham (1931–2004), actor, Walker, Texas Ranger
 Travis Willingham (born 1981), actor, voice actor
 Chill Wills (1903–1978), Academy Award-nominated actor and singer
 Andrew Wilson (born 1964), actor
 Chandra Wilson (born 1969), actress, Miranda Bailey on Grey's Anatomy
 Dooley Wilson (1886–1953), actor, singer, played "Sam" in Casablanca
 Luke Wilson (born 1971), actor, Bottle Rocket, The Royal Tenenbaums, Idiocracy
 Owen Wilson (born 1968), actor, The Darjeeling Limited, Midnight in Paris, Cars
 Robert Wilson (born 1941), theatre director, playwright
 Trey Wilson (1948–1989), actor, Bull Durham, Raising Arizona
 William D. Wittliff (1940–2019), screenwriter, author, photographer
 Morgan Woodward (1925–2019), actor, Dallas, The Life and Legend of Wyatt Earp, Gunsmoke
 Doug Wright (born 1962), Pulitzer Prize- and Tony Award-winning playwright, screenwriter
 Robin Wright (born 1966), actress, The Princess Bride, House of Cards
 Natalie Zea (born 1975), actress, Justified, Dirty Sexy Money
 Nora Zehetner (born 1981), actress
 Renée Zellweger (born 1969), Academy Award-winning actress, Cold Mountain, Jerry Maguire, Chicago
 Craig Zisk (born 1950), television director, producer
 Randy Zisk (born 1959), television director, producer

Comedians

 Aaron Aryanpur, stand-up comedian
 Rodney Carrington (born 1968), comedian
 Wyatt Cenac (born 1976), stand-up comedian, actor, writer
 Ryan Cownie, stand-up comedian
 Kambri Crews (born 1971), comedic storyteller, memoirist
 Jeff Dunham (born 1962), ventriloquist, stand-up comedian
 Jade Esteban Estrada (born 1975), comedian, actor
 Bill Engvall (born 1957), comedian, actor
 Jake Flores, stand-up comedian
 Jack Handey (born 1949), writer for Saturday Night Live
 Bill Hicks (1961–1994), comedian
 KevJumba (Kevin Wu) (born 1990), comedian, YouTube celebrity
 Lashonda Lester (died 2017), comedian
 Freddy Lockhart (born 1979), comedian, actor
 Steve Martin (born 1945), comedian, actor
 Rasika Mathur (born 1976), comedian, actress, Wild 'n Out
 Ralphie May (1972–2017), comedian
 Doug Mellard, stand-up comedian
 Grady Nutt (1934–1982), humorist, Baptist minister
 Alex Reymundo, comedian, actor
 Iliza Shlesinger (born 1983), comedian
 Shuckey Duckey (Cecil Armstrong) (born 1956), comedian, circus ringmaster
 Freddy Soto (1970–2005), comedian, actor
 Ryan Stout (born 1982), comedian
 Greg Travis (born 1958), actor, stand-up comedian
 Paul Varghese (born 1977), comedian
 Stephnie Weir (born 1967), comedian, actress, MADtv
 White Chocolate (born 1969), BET Comic View
 Ron White (born 1956), comedian, actor
 Harris Wittels (1984–2015), comedian, actor, writer, producer, musician
 Dustin Ybarra (born 1989), comedian, actor

Magicians

 Jay Alexander (born 1958), magician
 J.B. Bobo (1910–1996), magician
 Richard Turner (born 1954), magician specializing in card manipulation
 Mark Wilson (1929–2021), magician

Music

A

 Dimebag Darrell Abbott (1966–2004), rock guitarist
 Jerry Abbott (born 1944), country songwriter, producer
 Dave Abbruzzese (born 1968), rock drummer
 Jacques Abram (1915–1998), classical pianist
 Kevin Abstract (Clifford Ian Simpson) (born 1996), rapper, singer-songwriter, director
 Yolanda Adams (born 1961), Grammy Award-winning gospel singer
 Samuel Adler (born 1928), composer, conductor, educator
 Pepe Aguilar (born 1968), ranchera/mariachi/pop singer-songwriter
 Hanan Alattar (born 1986), opera singer
 Don Albert (1908–1980), jazz trumpeter, bandleader
 Carter Albrecht (1973–2007), rock keyboardist, guitarist, classical pianist
 Victor Alessandro (1915–1976), conductor
 Alger "Texas" Alexander (1900–1954), blues singer
 Dave Alexander (aka Omar Sharriff) (1938–2012), blues singer, pianist
 Terry Allen (born 1943), musician
 Jerry Allison (1939–2022), musician
 Joe Allison (1924–2002), country songwriter, producer
 Ruby Allmond (1923–2006), country songwriter, fiddler, guitarist
 Tommy Allsup (1931–2017), rock/country guitarist
 Nancy Ames (born 1937), pop/folk singer
 Trey Anastasio (born 1964), rock singer/guitarist
 Christopher M. Anderson, college band director
 Coffey Anderson (born 1978), country singer-songwriter
 Keith Anderson (born 1970), jazz saxophonist
 Ryan Anthony (1969–2020), trumpet player
 Clifford Antone (1949–2006), blues club owner, record producer, mentor to musicians
 Charlie Applewhite (1932–2001), singer, radio host
 Katie Armiger (born 1991), country singer
 Elaine Arnold (1911–2006), opera singer
 Lev Aronson (1912–1988), classical cellist and teacher
 Charline Arthur (1929–1987), boogie-woogie/blues singer
 Gil Askey (1925–2014), jazz/Motown trumpet player, composer
 Gene Austin (1900–1972), pop/jazz singer-songwriter
 James Austin (born 1937), classical trumpet player, educator
 Larry Austin (1930–2018), composer, educator
 Gene Autry (1907–1998), country music singer
 John Axelrod (born 1966), classical conductor
 Pedro Ayala (1911–1990), conjunto accordionist-songwriter

Ba–Bm

 Harry Babasin (1921–1988), jazz bassist
 Erykah Badu (born 1971), R&B and hip hop singer
 Zuill Bailey (born 1972), classical cellist
 Wilfred Bain (1908–1997), music educator
 Zac Baird (born 1971), rock keyboardist
 Sam Baker (born 1954), folk singer-songwriter, survived a terrorist bombing attack by Shining Path
 Marcia Ball (born 1949), blues singer
 Clint Ballard Jr. (1931–2008), songwriter
 Smith Ballew (1902–1984), singer, bandleader, actor
 Moe Bandy (born 1944), country singer
 Kirko Bangz (born 1989), southern hip hop music and R&B singer
 Joseph Banowetz (1936–2022), classical pianist, teacher
 Stephen Barber (born 1952), symphonic/pop/rock composer, arranger
 Danny Barnes (born 1961), country/jazz/punk banjo player and guitarist
 Les Baxter (1922–1996), composer of lounge music and exotica
 Frank Beard (born 1949), drummer in ZZ Top
 George Beauchamp (1899–1941), maker and inventor of violins and guitars
 Jim Beck (1916–1956), country music talent agent, record promoter, recording studio owner, A&R engineer, record producer, music publisher
 Leila Bela, musician, writer, actress (born in Tehran, Iran, immigrated to Austin)
 Archie Bell (born 1944), singer (Archie Bell & the Drells)
 Jesse Belvin (1932–1960), R&B pianist, singer-songwriter
 Tex Beneke (1914–2000), big-band saxophonist, singer, bandleader
 Ray Benson (born 1951), Western swing singer-songwriter, producer, Asleep at the Wheel
 Buster Benton (1932–1996), blues guitarist, singer
 Taz Bentley, rock drummer (Burden Brothers)
 Shelly Berg (born 1955), jazz pianist and educator
 David Berman (born 1967), alt-rock singer-songwriter (Silver Jews)
 Big Moe (Kenneth Moore) (1974–2007), rapper
 Bill Smith Combo, aka Tommy & The Tom Toms, DFW rock 'n roll group
 Ryan Bingham (born 1981), country singer-songwriter
 Scott H. Biram (born 1974), blues, punk, country, heavy metal musician
 Cedric Bixler-Zavala (born 1974), dub, salsa and progressive rock musician
 Black Ace (Babe Kyro Lemon Turner) (1907–1972), blues singer, guitarist
 Clint Black (born 1962), country music singer, raised in Houston
 Robert Black (1950–1993), classical conductor, pianist, composer
 William Black (1952–2003), classical pianist, educator
 Zach Blair (born 1973), guitarist of Rise Against
 Clay Blaker (born 1950), country singer-songwriter
 William Blankenship (1928–2017), opera singer, educator
 Jules Bledsoe (1898–1943), Broadway singer
 Julien Paul Blitz (1885–1951), conductor, cellist

Bn–Bz

 Craig Bohmler (born 1956), opera/musical-theatre composer
 Zuzu Bollin (1922–1990), blues guitarist
 Juke Boy Bonner (1932–1978), blues musician
 Emanuel Borok (1944–2020), classical violinist
 Brent Bourgeois (born 1958), rock singer, producer
 Jane Bowers (1921–2000), folk singer-songwriter
 Euday L. Bowman (1887–1949), ragtime/blues pianist, composer
 Euel Box (1928–2017), music producer, composer, arranger, trumpeter
 Boxcar Willie (Lecil Travis Martin) (1931–1999), country singer
 Bill Boyd (1910–1977), country singer, guitarist
 Craig Wayne Boyd (born 1978), country singer and winner of NBC's The Voice season 7
 Calvin Boze (1916–1970), jazz/R&B trumpeter
 Danielle Bradbery (born 1996), country singer
 Jeff Bradetich (born 1957), classical double bass player and educator
 Bobby Bradford (born 1934), jazz trumpeter, cornetist, bandleader, composer
 Doyle Bramhall (1949–2011), blues singer-songwriter, drummer
 Doyle Bramhall II (born 1968), blues/rock guitarist
 Zachary Breaux (1960–1997), jazz guitarist
 David Breeden (1946–2005), classical clarinetist
 Leon Breeden (1921–2010), jazz bandleader, musician, educator
 Edie Brickell (born 1966), singer, married to Paul Simon
 Leon Bridges (born 1989), soul singer-songwriter
 Billy Briggs (born 1977), independent musician-songwriter
 Houston Bright (1916–1970), choral composer
 Ally Brooke (born 1993), pop singer
 Karen Brooks (born 1954), country singer
 Cecil Brower (1914–1965), country fiddler
 The 5 Browns (born 1979, 1980, 1983, 1984, 1986), classical pianist siblings born in Texas, raised in Texas and Utah
 Charles Brown (1922–1999), blues singer, pianist
 Clarence "Gatemouth" Brown (1924–2005), blues instrumentalist
 Jewel Brown (born 1937), jazz/blues singer
 Lacey Brown (born 1985), folk/pop singer
 Milton Brown (1903–1936), Western swing singer, bandleader
 Rex Brown (born 1964), musician
 Cliff Bruner (1915–2000), western swing fiddler, bandleader
 Anshel Brusilow (1928–2018), orchestra conductor and violinist
 Stephen Bruton (1948–2009), country musician
 Mike Buck (born 1952), blues/rock drummer
 Betty Buckley (born 1947), actress, singer
 Teddy Buckner (1909–1994), jazz/Dixieland trumpeter
 Bun B (Bernard Freeman) (born 1973), rapper
 T-Bone Burnett (born 1948), rock/country songwriter, musician, producer
 Gerald Busby (born 1935), classical and film composer
 Johnny Bush (1935–2020), country singer-songwriter
 William Butler (born 1982), member of Arcade Fire
 Win Butler (born 1980), lead singer of Canadian indie-rock band Arcade Fire

Ca–Cm

 Ryan Cabrera (born 1982), singer-songwriter
 Ernie Caceres (1911–1971), jazz instrumentalist
 Chris Cagle (born 1968), country music artist
 Kimberly Caldwell (born 1982), pop singer, actress
 Tevin Campbell (born 1976), musician
 Tony Campise (1943–2010), jazz woodwind player
 Laura Canales (1954–2005), Tejano singer
 Hayes Carll (born 1976), country singer-songwriter
 Chris Carmichael (born 1962), pop/country string instrumentalist, arranger
 Vikki Carr (born 1941), jazz, pop, country and Latin music singer
 Zachary Carrettin (born 1972), classical conductor, composer, violinist
 Georgia Carroll (1919–2011), big-band singer, actress, model
 Johnny Carroll (1937–1995), rockabilly singer, guitarist
 John Carter (1929–1991), jazz instrumentalist, composer, club owner
 Kristopher Carter (born 1972), classical and Emmy Award-winning film composer
 Cindy Cashdollar (born 1955), Western swing/bluegrass steel guitarist
 AJ Castillo (born 1986), Tejano singer
 Joyce Castle (born 1939), opera singer
 Jason Castro (born 1987), pop singer/guitarist
 Hollie Cavanagh (born 1993), pop singer
 John Cerminaro (born 1947), classical horn player
 Chamillionaire (born 1979), rapper
 Greyson Chance (born 1997), pop/rock singer, pianist
 John Barnes Chance (1932–1972), classical composer, timpanist
 Bruce Channel (born 1940), rock and roll singer
 Gary Chapman (born 1957), contemporary Christian singer-songwriter
 Mark Chesnutt (born 1963), country singer-songwriter
 Chingo Bling (Pedro Herrera III) (born 1979), rapper, producer
 Harry Choates (1922–1951), Cajun fiddler
 Charlie Christian (1916–1942), swing/jazz guitarist
 Chungha (Kim Chan-mi) (born February 9, 1996), South Korean musician
 Ciara (Ciara Harris) (born 1985), musician
 Gary Clark Jr. (born 1984), Texas blues musician
 Guy Clark (1941–2016), country singer-songwriter
 Lakrea Clark (born 1991), singer-songwriter
 Victoria Clark (born 1959), singer, Tony Award-winning actress
 Kelly Clarkson (born 1982), singer, American Idol winner
 Cynthia Clawson (born 1948), Grammy Award-winning gospel singer
 James Clay (1935–1995), jazz instrumentalist
 Sonny Clay (1899–1973), jazz pianist, drummer, bandleader
 Laura Claycomb (born 1968), operatic soprano
 Van Cliburn (1934–2013), pianist (born in Louisiana, raised in Texas)

Cn–Cz

 Arnett Cobb (1918–1989), jazz saxophonist
 Eddie Coker (born 1960), singer-songwriter of music for children
 Henry Coker (1919–1979), jazz trombonist
 Bongo Joe Coleman (1923–1999), jazz and street drummer
 Gary B.B. Coleman (1947–1994), soul/blues guitarist, singer-songwriter, producer
 Jerry "Bo" Coleman, (born 1936) radio disc jockey; KDAV in Lubbock
 Ornette Coleman (1930–2015), jazz saxophonist
 John Ford Coley (born 1948), rock musician (England Dan & John Ford Coley)
 Bill Collings (1948–2017), guitar maker
 Albert Collins (1932–1993), blues musician
 Jim Collins (born 1956), country singer-songwriter
 Eugene Conley (1908–1981), opera singer
 Barbara Smith Conrad (1940–2017), opera singer
 David Cook (born 1982), rock singer-songwriter (born in Houston, raised in Missouri)
 Nick Cooper (born 1968), drummer, record producer, composer, filmmaker, social activist
 Johnny Copeland (1937–1997), blues guitarist, singer
 Larry Coryell (1943–2017), jazz fusion guitarist
 James Cotton (1935–2017), blues harmonica player, singer-songwriter
 Josie Cotton (Kathleen Josey) (born 1956), rock singer
 Orville Couch (1935–2002), country singer-songwriter
 Cowboy Troy (born 1970), rap singer-songwriter
 Bryan-Michael Cox (born 1977), record producer, songwriter
 Cindy Cox (born 1961), classical composer
 Pee Wee Crayton (1914–1985), R&B/blues guitarist, singer
 Roger Creager (born 1971), country singer
 Dash Crofts (born 1940), soft-rock musician (Seals and Crofts)
 Christopher Cross (born 1951), singer
 Randy Crouch (born 1952), country instrumentalist
 Wayne Crouse (1924–2000), violist
 Rodney Crowell (born 1950), country singer-songwriter
 Lella Cuberli (born 1945), opera singer
 Henry Cuesta (1931–2003), jazz/big-band clarinetist
 Jim Cullum Jr. (1941–2019), Dixieland/jazz cornetist and bandleader
 Ryan Culwell (born 1980), country/folk singer-songwriter
 Jeff Current, lead singer for Against All Will
 Mac Curtis (1939–2013), rockabilly musician
 Sonny Curtis (born 1937), country/pop singer-songwriter

D

 Ted Daffan (1912–1996), country guitarist, songwriter
 Pappy Daily (1902–1987), country music record producer
 Floyd Dakil (1945–2010), pop guitarist-songwriter
 Vernon Dalhart (Marion Slaughter) (1883–1948), country singer-songwriter
 Chris Dave (born 1973), jazz/gospel/hip hop drummer, composer, bandleader
 Ivan Davis (1932–2018), classical pianist
 Mac Davis (1942–2020), musician
 Monte Hill Davis (1932–2018), classical pianist
 Ronnie Dawson (1939–2003), rockabilly musician
 Bobby Day (Robert James Byrd Sr.) (1928–1990), rock and roll/R&B singer-songwriter, instrumentalist, producer
 Eddie Dean (1907–1999), country singer-songwriter
 Jimmy Dean (1928–2010), country singer, television personality, businessman
 Bill Dees (1939–2012), country songwriter, "Oh, Pretty Woman"
 Ryan Delahoussaye (born 1976), rock instrumentalist
 Tim DeLaughter (born 1965), rock singer
 Brett Deubner (born 1968), classical violist
 Lindsay Deutsch (born 1984), classical violinist
 Al Dexter (1905–1984), country singer
 Mike Dillon, rock drummer-singer-songwriter
 Floyd Dixon (1929–2006), R&B pianist, singer
 Jessy Dixon (1938–2011), gospel singer
 DJ Screw (Robert Earl Davis Jr.) (1971–2000), hip-hop artist
 The D.O.C. (born 1968), rapper
 Deryl Dodd (born 1964), country music singer-songwriter
 Helen Donath (born 1940), operatic soprano
 Kenny Dorham (1924–1972), jazz trumpeter, singer, composer
 Bob Dorough (1923–2018), jazz vocalist, pianist, composer, songwriter, arranger, producer
 Dorrough (born 1986), rapper
 Amber Dotson (born 1973), country singer
 Bobby Doyle (1939–2006), jazz singer
 Damita Jo DuBlanc (1930–1998), lounge singer, actress, comedian
 Sherman H. Dudley (1872–1940), vaudeville and black musical performer and producer
 Hilary Duff (born 1987), singer
 Ted Dunbar (1937–1998), jazz guitarist, composer, educator
 Johnny Duncan (1938–2006), country singer
 Tommy Duncan (1911–1967), Western swing singer-songwriter
 Bob Dunn (1908–1971), jazz trombonist, Western swing steel guitarist
 Holly Dunn (1957–2016), country singer
 Ronnie Dunn (born 1953), country singer
 Chauntelle DuPree (born 1981), rock/pop guitarist (Eisley)
 Garron DuPree (born 1989), rock/pop bass guitarist (Eisley)
 Sherri DuPree (born 1983), rock/pop singer, guitarist, lyricist (Eisley)
 Stacy DuPree (born 1988), rock/pop keyboardist, singer (Eisley)
 Weston DuPree (born 1986), rock/pop drummer (Eisley)
 Eddie Durham (1906–1987), jazz guitarist, trombonist, composer, arranger

E

 Robert Ealey (1925–2001), blues singer
 Steve Earle (born 1955), singer-songwriter, musician
 Reed Easterwood (born 1967), rock guitarist
 Roger Edens (1905–1970), film composer
 Emily Elbert (born 1988), folk/soul/jazz/pop singer-songwriter

 Willard Somers Elliot (1926–2000), classical bassoonist
 Herb Ellis (1921–2010), jazz guitarist
 Merrill Leroy Ellis (1916–1981), classical composer
 Robert Ellis (born 1988), country/rock singer-songwriter
 Terry Ellis (born 1966), R&B singer (En Vogue)
 Paul Ellison (born 1941), classical bassist and teacher
 Joe Ely (born 1947), singer-songwriter, guitarist
 Ralna English (born 1942), singer from The Lawrence Welk Show
 Roky Erickson (1947–2019), rock singer-songwriter, instrumentalist
 Booker Ervin (1930–1970), jazz saxophonist
 Alejandro Escovedo (born 1951), rock guitarist, singer-songwriter
 Dale Evans (1912–2001), country singer-songwriter, guitarist
 Herschel Evans (1909–1939), jazz saxophonist
 Roberto Eyzaguirre (1923–2004), classical pianist and teacher

F

 Terry Fator (born 1965), singer, ventriloquist, impersonator
 Fat Pat (Patrick Hawkins) (1970–1998), rapper
 Jimmy Lee Fautheree (1934–2004), rockabilly singer
 José Feghali (1961–2014), classical pianist and teacher
 Wilton Felder (1940–2015), jazz saxophonist, bassist
 Nathan Felix (born 1981), classical composer
 Freddy Fender (1937–2006), musician
 Keith Ferguson (1946–1997), blues/rock bass guitarist, The Fabulous Thunderbirds
 Rosita Fernandez (1919–2006), Tejano/pop singer, actress
 Ernie Fields (c. 1904 – 1997), jazz trombonist
 Carl Finch (born 1951), polka musician, founder of Brave Combo
 Charles Finger (1867–1941), music teacher, conservatory administrator; later a noted author of children's literature
 Sonny Fisher (1931–2005), rockabilly singer-songwriter, guitarist
 Rosie Flores (born 1950), country singer
 Carlisle Floyd (1926–2021), opera composer
 George Floyd (1974–2020), rapper, died in Minneapolis Police custody
 Jim Bob Floyd (born 1929), classical pianist, composer
 Blaze Foley (Michael Fuller) (1949–1989), folk singer-songwriter
 Bruce Ford (born 1956), operatic tenor
 Radney Foster (born 1959), country music singer-songwriter
 Ruthie Foster (born 1964), blues/folk singer-songwriter
 Kevin Fowler (born 1966), country singer
 Curly Fox (1910–1995), country fiddler
 James Francies (born 1995), jazz pianist, composer
 Kirk Franklin (born 1970), gospel singer
 Denny Freeman (1944–2021), blues instrumentalist, songwriter
 Eddie Freeman (1909–1987), jazz/flamenco guitarist, arranger, teacher
 Walter Fried (1877–1925), violinist and conductor
 Kinky Friedman (born 1944), singer-songwriter, novelist, columnist, candidate for governor of Texas
 Lefty Frizzell (1928–1975), country singer
 Steven Fromholz (1945–2014), singer-songwriter
 Akiko Fujimoto, orchestra conductor
 Bobby Fuller (1942–1966), rock singer and guitarist
 Marjorie Fulton (1909–1962), classical violinist and teacher
 Anson Funderburgh (born 1954), blues guitarist, bandleader
 Justin Furstenfeld (born 1975), rock singer and guitarist

G

 Kyle Gann (born 1955), composer, musicologist, music critic
 Red Garland (1923–1984), jazz pianist
 Travis Garland (born 1989), singer-songwriter
 Joy Garrett (1945–1993), big-band singer, actress
 Henry Garza (born 1978), Los Lonely Boys lead guitarist of San Angelo, 2005 Grammy Award winner
 Jojo Garza (born 1980), Los Lonely Boys bass of San Angelo, 2005 Grammy Award winner
 Ringo Garza (born 1981), Los Lonely Boys drummer of San Angelo, 2005 Grammy Award winner
 Larry Gatlin (born 1948), singer-songwriter, member of the Gatlin Brothers
 Zelma Watson George (1903–1994), opera singer, musicologist
 Richard Giangiulio (born 1942), classical trumpet player and conductor
 Billy Gibbons (born 1949), guitarist in ZZ Top
 Mickey Gilley (1936–2022), country musician
 Don Gillis (1912–1978), composer, conductor, producer, educator
 Everett M. Gilmore (1935–2005), classical tubist
 Jimmie Dale Gilmore (born 1945), singer-songwriter
 Johnny Gimble (1926–2015), country fiddler
 John Giordano (born 1937), orchestra conductor
 Jimmy Giuffre (1921–2008), jazz composer, arranger, clarinetist and saxophonist
 Robert Glasper (born 1978), jazz pianist
 Jack Glatzer (born 1939), concert violinist
 Terry Glaze (born 1964), country/heavy-metal singer, guitarist
 Darrell Glenn (1935–1990), country singer
 Lloyd Glenn (1909–1985), R&B pianist, bandleader, arranger
 Tyree Glenn (1912–1974), big band/jazz trombonist
 Lillian Glinn (1902–1978), blues singer-songwriter
 David Gockley (born 1943), opera company administrator
 Renée Elise Goldsberry (born 1971), singer-songwriter, actress
 Tomasz Golka (born 1975), classical conductor, composer, violinist
 David Golub (1950–2000), classical pianist, conductor
 Selena Gomez (born 1992), actress and singer
 Allie Gonino (born 1990), actress and pop singer
 Dennis González (1954–2022), jazz trumpet player, educator
 Floyd Graham (1902–1974), bandleader, educator
 Larry Graham (born 1946), soul, R&B, and funk musician
 Susan Graham (born 1960), opera singer
 Donald Grantham (born 1947), classical composer and music educator
 Mitchell 'Mitch' Grassi (born 1992), a cappella singer
 Conan Gray (born 1998), pop singer-songwriter
 Dobie Gray (1940–2011), soul singer-songwriter
 Jerry Gray (1915–1976), swing-era arranger and bandleader
 Pat Green (born 1972), country singer-songwriter
 Thurman Green (1940–1997), jazz trombonist
 Art Greenhaw (born 1954), Grammy Award-winning recording artist, producer, engineer
 Nanci Griffith (1953–2021), singer-songwriter
 Larry Groce (born 1948), singer-songwriter of country music, children's songs; radio host
 Dewey Groom (1918–1997), country singer
 Texas Guinan (1884–1933), western singer, actress
 David Wendel Guion (1892–1981), composer, arranger of folk tunes
 Guitar Shorty (David Kearney) (born 1939), blues guitarist
 Woody Guthrie (1912–1967), folk singer-songwriter (spent several years in Pampa, during the formative period of his youth)
 Billy Guy (Frank Phillips Jr.) (1936–2002), R&B/rock and roll singer (The Coasters)

H–I

 Marcus Haddock (born 1957), opera singer
 Dan Haerle (born 1937), jazz pianist, composer, author, teacher
 Monte Hale (1919–2009), country singer, actor
 Robert Hale (born 1933), opera singer
 Gene Hall (1913–1993), jazz saxophonist, music educator
 Tommy Hall (born 1943), rock electric jug player
 Stuart Hamblen (1908–1989), country singer, candidate for U.S. President
 Ed Hamell, punk-rock singer-songwriter, guitarist
 Bob Hames (1920–1998), jazz guitarist
 Butch Hancock (born 1945), country/folk singer-songwriter
 Gerre Hancock (1934–2012), organist, composer
 Tommy Hancock (1929–2020), country singer, bandleader
 John Handy (born 1933), jazz saxophonist
 John Hardee (1919–1984), jazz saxophonist
 Glen Hardin (born 1939), rock and roll piano player
 Maud Cuney Hare (1874–1936), music historian, civil rights activist
 Roy Hargrove (1969–2018), jazz trumpet player
 Eric Harland (born 1976), jazz drummer
 Everette Harp (born 1961), jazz saxophonist
 Lynn Harrell (1944–2020), concert cellist raised in Texas
 Mack Harrell (1909–1960), operatic baritone
 Peppermint Harris (Harrison Nelson Jr.) (1925–1999), R&B singer, guitarist
 R. H. Harris (1916–2000), gospel singer
 Daniel Hart (born 1976), indie pop singer-songwriter, violinist
 Earl Harvin, rock drummer
 Bess Lomax Hawes (1921–2009), folk musician, folklorist
 Nelly (real name Cornell Haynes) (born 1974), rapper, singer-songwriter, entrepreneur, investor, and occasional actor
 Gibby Haynes (born 1957), lead singer of the Butthole Surfers
 Cedric Haywood (1914–1969), jazz pianist
 Roy Head (1941–2020), Roy Head and The Traits
 Sundance Head (born 1979), country singer-songwriter, contestant from American Idol season 6 and winner of NBC's The Voice season 11
 Chet Helms (1942–2005), music promoter, called father of the Summer of Love
 Julius Hemphill (1938–1995), jazz composer, saxophonist
 Bugs Henderson (1943–2012), blues guitarist
 Tom Hendricks, rock/blues guitarist, magazine writer, editor
 Terri Hendrix (born 1968), contemporary folk singer-songwriter
 Don Henley (born 1947), musician with rock group the Eagles
 Shifty Henry (1921–1958), R&B/jazz instrumentalist, songwriter
 Walter Herbert (1898–1975), opera conductor and administrator
 Ally Brooke Hernandez (born 1993), pop singer
 Cenobio Hernandez (1863–1950), classical composer
 Anna Goodman Hertzberg (1864–1937), pianist, civic leader, philanthropist
 Casey Hess, rock guitarist (Burden Brothers)
 Carolyn Hester (born 1937), folk singer-songwriter
 Sara Hickman (born 1963), rock/pop singer-songwriter
 Johnnie High (1929–2010), country musician and impresario
 Ray Hildebrand (born 1940), pop singer, Paul & Paula
 Dusty Hill (1945–2021), bass guitarist in ZZ Top
 Z. Z. Hill (1935–1984), blues singer
 Tish Hinojosa (born 1955), Mexican-American folk singer
 James William Hipp (born 1934), classical trumpet player, educator, music administrator
 Desmond Hoebig (born 1961), classical cellist and teacher
 Ernst Hoffmann (c. 1899 – 1956), orchestra conductor
 Adolph Hofner (1916–2000), western swing bandleader
 Smokey Hogg (1914–1960), country blues singer, guitarist
 John Holiday (born 1985), opera singer
 Jennifer Holliday (born 1960), Grammy Award-winning singer, actress
 Buddy Holly (1936–1959), singer-songwriter
 Steve Holy (born 1972), country singer
 Stix Hooper (born 1938), jazz drummer
 Sam Lightnin' Hopkins (1912–1982), blues musician
 Jazzmeia Horn (born 1991), jazz singer-songwriter
 Johnny Horton (1925–1960), country singer
 Brad Houser (born 1960), rock instrumentalist
 Scott Hoying (born 1991), a cappella singer
 Frank Huang (born 1978), concert violinist
 Ray Wylie Hubbard (born 1946), country singer-songwriter
 Bill Hughes (1930–2018), jazz trombonist, bandleader
 Billie Hughes (1948–1998), singer-songwriter, musician
 Joe "Guitar" Hughes (1937–2003), blues singer, guitarist
 Bobbi Humphrey (born 1950), jazz flutist
 Jerry Hunt (1943–1993), avant-garde composer
 Ivory Joe Hunter (1914–1974), R&B singer-songwriter, pianist
 Long John Hunter (1931–2016), blues guitarist, singer-songwriter
 Willie Hutch (1944–2005), blues/R&B singer-songwriter, instrumentalist, record producer
 Clarence Hutchenrider (1908–1991), jazz clarinetist
 Walter Hyatt (1949–1996), folk singer, guitarist
 Vanilla Ice (born 1967), rapper
 Jack Ingram (born 1970), country singer-songwriter

J

 Jill Jackson (born 1942), pop singer, Paul & Paula
 Melvin Jackson (1915–1976), blues guitarist
 Ronald Shannon Jackson (1940–2013), jazz drummer
 Illinois Jacquet (1922–2004), jazz saxophonist, bassoonist
 Russell Jacquet (1917–1990), jazz trumpeter
 Sarah Jaffe (born 1986), folk/rock singer-songwriter
 Casey James (born 1983), pop/country singer, guitarist
 Harry James (1916–1983), jazz/big band trumpeter (lived and worked in Beaumont as an adolescent)
 Sarah Jarosz (born 1991), Americana/bluegrass singer-songwriter, instrumentalist
 Blind Lemon Jefferson (1897–1929), blues musician
 Speight Jenkins (born 1937), opera administrator, producer
 Waylon Jennings (1937–2002), country singer
 Michael Jerome (born 1967), rock drummer
 Flaco Jiménez (born 1939), Tejano accordionist
 Santiago Jiménez Jr. (born 1961), conjunto accordionist
 Kari Jobe (born 1981), Christian singer-songwriter
 Evan Johns (1956–2017), rockabilly guitarist
 Blind Willie Johnson (1897–1945), blues/spirituals singer, guitarist
 Budd Johnson (1910–1984), jazz saxophonist
 Conrad O. Johnson (1915–2008), music educator
 David N. Johnson (1922–1987), classical organist, composer, educator
 Eric Johnson (born 1954), rock/jazz/country guitarist
 Gus Johnson (1913–2000), jazz drummer
 Keg Johnson (1908–1967), jazz trombonist
 Money Johnson (1918–1978), jazz trumpeter
 Virgil L. Johnson (1935–2013), musician, The Velvets
 Willie Neal Johnson (1935–2001), gospel singer
 Daniel Johnston (1961–2019), rock singer-songwriter
 Nicholas Jonas (born 1992), singer, guitarist of the Jonas Brothers
 George Jones (1931–2013), country singer
 Little Hat Jones (1899–1981), blues singer, guitarist
 Maggie Jones (1894–unknown), blues singer, pianist, known as "The Texas Nightingale"
 Mike Jones (born 1981), rapper
 Norah Jones (born 1979), soul/folk singer-songwriter, born in New York City but raised in Texas
 Tom Jones (born 1928), lyricist of musical theater
 Janis Joplin (1943–1970), blues/rock singer
 Scott Joplin (c. 1867 – 1917), ragtime musician and composer
 Esteban Jordan (1939–2010), conjunto/Tejano accordionist
 Jimmy Joy (1902–1962), jazz/big-band saxophonist, clarinetist

K

 Kurt Kaiser (1934–2018), church music composer
 Benjamin Kamins (born 1952), classical bassoonist
 Milton Katims (1909–2006), concert violist and conductor
 Garrett Keast (born 1971), classical conductor
 Robert Earl Keen (born 1957), singer-songwriter
 Bobby Keys (1943–2014), rock/jazz saxophonist, played with The Rolling Stones
 Peck Kelley (1898–1980), jazz pianist and bandleader
 Kent Kennan (1913–2003), classical composer
 King Curtis (Curtis Ousley) (1934–1971), R&B/pop saxophonist
 Freddie King (1934–1976), blues guitarist and singer
 Ralph Kirshbaum (born 1946), cellist
 Beyoncé (born 1981), R&B singer, actress
 John Knowles (born 1942), popular/classical guitarist, composer, arranger, music educator, physicist 
 Solange Knowles (born 1986), R&B singer-songwriter, actress, model, dancer
 Buddy Knox (1933–1999), rockabilly singer-songwriter
 Normani Kordei (born 1996), pop singer, dancer
 Karl Korte (1928–2022), composer, music educator
 Lili Kraus (1903–1986), classical pianist
 Hans Kreissig (1857–1929), conductor, pianist, educator; created Dallas Symphony Orchestra
 Kris Kristofferson (born 1936), singer-songwriter, actor
 Philip Krumm (born 1941), composer

L

 Fredell Lack (1922–2017), concert violinist and teacher
 Eugene Lacritz (1929–2012), classical/Broadway clarinetist, saxophonist, conductor
 Jimmy LaFave (1955–2017), folk/country/rock singer-songwriter
 Gary Lakes (born 1950), opera singer
 Alex Lambert (born 1990), pop singer-songwriter
 Miranda Lambert (born 1983), country music singer-songwriter
 Harold Land (1928–2001), bop saxophonist
 Kasey Lansdale (born 1988), country singer-songwriter
 Shelly Lares (born 1971), Tejano singer-songwriter
 Milt Larkin (1910–1996), jazz trumpeter, bandleader
 Prince Lasha (1929–2008), jazz instrumentalist
 William P. Latham (1917–2004), classical composer
 Hubert Laws (born 1939), flutist, saxophonist
 Melissa Lawson (born 1976), country singer
 Lead Belly (Huddie Ledbetter) (1888–1949), blues musician
 Paul Leary (born 1957), rock guitarist
 Johnny Lee (born 1946), country singer
 Shannon Lee (born 1992), classical violinist
 Will Lee (born 1952), jazz/rock bassist
 William Franklin Lee III (1929–2011), jazz pianist, composer, arranger, author, music educator
 Paul Leim (born 1950), country/rock/pop drummer
 Raymond Lewenthal (1923–1988), concert pianist
 Vaden Todd Lewis (born 1965), grunge singer-guitarist (The Toadies, Burden Brothers)
 Willie Lewis (1905–1971), jazz clarinetist, bandleader
 Lil Flip (Wesley Weston Jr.) (born 1981), rapper
 Mance Lipscomb (1895–1976), Blues singer, guitarist
 Maggie Lindemann (born 1998), singer-songwriter
 Robert Lipsett (born 1947), concert violinist and master teacher
 Bill Lister (1923–2009), country singer
 Andrew Litton (born 1959), orchestra conductor
 Lizzo (Melissa Jefferson) (born 1988), rapper, singer-songwriter
 Lisa Loeb (born 1968), singer-songwriter, actress
 Hannibal Lokumbe (born Marvin Peterson) (born 1948), jazz trumpet player, composer
 Alan Lomax (1915–2002), folk singer, guitarist, ethnomusicologist, folklorist
 John London (1942–2000), pop/rock guitarist, songwriter; television production crew
 Jim Long (born 1943), music producer, publisher; entrepreneur
 Isidro López (1929–2004), Tejano bandleader
 Trini Lopez (1937–2020), Hispanic musician, singer
 Demi Lovato (born 1992), singer, actress
 Lyle Lovett (born 1957), singer-songwriter
 David Lowery (born 1960), rock guitarist, singer-songwriter
 Josephine Lucchese (1893–1974), opera singer
 LeToya Luckett (born 1981), singer
 Bob Luman (1937–1978), country/rockabilly singer
 Anne Lundy (born 1954), classical conductor, music educator
 Lunic (Kaitee Page) (born 1985), electropop singer, multi-instrumentalist
 Ray Lynch (born 1943), classical guitarist and lutenist
 Barbara Lynn (born 1942), R&B guitarist, singer-songwriter

Ma–Mm

 Machine Gun Kelly (Colson Baker) (born 1990), rapper
 Michael Madden (born 1979), bassist for Maroon 5
 Clif Magness (born 1957), pop songwriter, producer
 Martie Maguire (born 1969), country singer-songwriter (The Dixie Chicks)
 Austin Mahone (born 1996), pop singer
 Martin Mailman (1932–2000), classical composer and educator
 Lloyd Maines (born 1951), musician, producer
 Natalie Maines (born 1974), musician
 Major (Major R. Johnson Finley) (born 1984), pop/soul singer-songwriter
 Petronel Malan (born 1974), concert pianist
 Kirstin 'Kirstie' Maldonado (born 1992), a cappella singer
 Post Malone (born 1995), rap singer-songwriter
 Barbara Mandrell (born 1948), country singer
 Louise Mandrell (born 1954), country singer
 David Mann (born 1966), gospel singer, actor 
 Tamela Mann (born 1966), gospel singer, actress
 Chris Marion (born 1962), rock musician member of Little River Band
 Tina Marsh (1954–2009), jazz singer, composer
 David Martin (1937–1987) rock musician, member of Sam The Sham & The Pharaohs, Tommy & The Tom Toms
 Mary Martin (1913–1990), Broadway singer, actress
 Ana María Martínez (born 1971), opera singer
 Narciso Martínez (1911–1992), conjunto singer, accordionist
 Óscar Martínez (born 1934), Tejano musician, songwriter
 Rhema Marvanne (born 2002), gospel singer
 Curt Massey (1910–1991), country musician
 Louise Massey (1902–1983), country singer-songwriter
 Eduardo Mata (1942–1995), orchestra conductor
 Johnny Mathis (born 1935), singer
 Johnny "Country" Mathis (1930–2011), country singer-songwriter
 Rich Matteson (1929–1993), jazz brass player, bandleader, educator
 Joe B. Mauldin (1940–2015), rock and roll bass player
 Pete Mayes (1938–2008), blues singer-songwriter, guitarist
 Sally Mayes (born 1959), Broadway singer and actress, jazz/rock singer
 Timothy McAllister (born 1972), classical saxophonist
 Leon McAuliffe (1917–1988), Western swing guitarist
 W. Francis McBeth (1933–2012), composer, music educator
 Erin McCarley (born 1979), alternative music singer-songwriter
 Delbert McClinton (born 1940), singer-songwriter, instrumentalist
 Mary McCormic (1889–1981), opera singer, educator
 Neal McCoy (born 1958), country singer
 David McEnery (1914–2002), country/Christian singer-songwriter, guitarist
 Nikki McKibbin (1978–2020), rock singer-songwriter
 Ray McKinley (1910–1995), jazz drummer, singer, bandleader
 Eliza Jane McKissack (1828–1900), music educator and administrator, singer, pianist
 Ian McLagan (1945–2014), rock keyboardist
 Cosmé McMoon (1901–1980), classical pianist, accompanied Florence Foster Jenkins
 James McMurtry (born 1962), folk-rock singer-songwriter, son of novelist Larry McMurtry
 Cindy McTee (born 1953), classical composer
 Meat Loaf (1951–2022), singer, actor
 David Meece (born 1952), contemporary Christian singer, pianist
 William B. Meeks Jr. (1921–1999), producer, composer, arranger of radio jingles; woodwind player
 Lydia Mendoza (1916–2007), Tejano singer
 Tom Merriman (1924–2009), commercial/jazz composer, arranger, producer, bandleader, educator
 Tift Merritt (born 1975), rock/country singer-songwriter
 Augie Meyers (born 1940), rock/Tejano keyboard player
 Louis Meyers (1955–2016), co-founder of South by Southwest music and media festival, multi-instrumentalist
 Bunny Michael, visual artist, musician, and rapper
 Aryn Michelle (born 1983), Christian pop/rock singer-songwriter
 Liz Mikel (born 1963), jazz singer, actress
 Amos Milburn (1927–1980), R&B singer, pianist
 Buddy Miles (1947–2008), rock drummer
 Frankie Miller (born 1931), country musician
 Julie Miller (born 1956), country singer-songwriter
 Rhett Miller (born 1970), alt-country singer
 Roger Miller (1936–1992), singer-songwriter
 Steve Miller (born 1943), blues/rock guitarist
 Mary Mills (born 1964), opera singer

Mn–Mz

 Charles Moffett (1929–1997), jazz drummer
 Bill Moffit (1926–2008), marching-band director, music arranger and composer
 Margarita Monet (born 1990), rock singer, pianist, composer, actress
 Bob Montgomery (1937–2014), rockabilly singer-songwriter, producer
 Johnny Moore (1906–1969), blues singer, guitarist
 Latonia Moore (born 1979), opera singer
 Oscar Moore (1916–1981), jazz/blues guitarist
 Tiny Moore (1920–1987), western swing instrumentalist
 Whistlin' Alex Moore (1899–1989), blues pianist, singer, whistler
 Michael Morales (born 1963), rock/pop singer-songwriter
 Jason Moran (born 1975), jazz pianist
 Mike Moreno (born 1978), jazz guitarist
 Mike Morgan (born 1959), blues guitarist, harmonica player, singer-songwriter
 Craig Morris (born 1968), classical trumpet player, educator
 Gary Morris (born 1948), country singer, actor
 Harold Morris (1890–1964), classical pianist, composer, educator
 Jay Hunter Morris (born 1963), opera singer
 Maren Morris (born 1990), country singer-songwriter
 Ella Mae Morse (1924–1999), blues/jazz/pop singer
 Mark Morton (born 1960), classical double bass player
 Lacey Mosley (born 1981), lead singer of alternative metal band Flyleaf
 Moon Mullican (1909–1967), country singer-songwriter, pianist
 Michael Martin Murphey (born 1945), country singer-songwriter
 Kacey Musgraves (born 1988), country singer-songwriter
 Mason Musso (born 1989), pop/rock singer-songwriter
 Sam Myers (1936–2006), blues singer, instrumentalist

N–O

 Johnny Nash (1940–2020), pop singer-songwriter
 Emilio Navaira (1962–2016), Latin pop/country musician
 Sam Neely (1948–2006), country singer, guitarist
 Nelly (born 1978), rapper
 Jimmy Nelson (1928–2007), blues singer-songwriter
 Steady Nelson (1913–1988), jazz/swing trumpeter
 Willie Nelson (born 1933), country singer-songwriter
 Michael Nesmith (1942–2021), singer with The Monkees
 Mickey Newbury (1940–2002), country/folk singer-songwriter
 David "Fathead" Newman (1933–2009), jazz saxophonist
 Johnny Nicholas (born 1948), blues singer, pianist
 Elena Nikolaidi (1909–2002), opera singer and teacher
 John Nitzinger (born 1948), rock guitarist, songwriter
 Kevin Noe (born 1969), classical conductor
 Timothy Nolen (born 1941), opera singer, Broadway singer and actor
 Normani (born 1996), pop singer
 Daron Norwood (1965–2015), country singer
 Salim Nourallah (born 1967), alt-country singer-songwriter
 Darrell Nulisch (born 1952), blues singer
 Gary P. Nunn (born 1945), country singer-songwriter
 Phil Ochs (1940–1976), folk singer-songwriter
 W. Lee "Pappy" O'Daniel (1890–1969), country-western singer-songwriter, Texas governor, and U.S. senator
 Adolfo Odnoposoff (1917–1992), classical cellist and teacher
 O.G. Style (Eric Woods) (1970–2008), rapper
 Paul Olefsky (1926–2013), classical cellist and teacher
 Pauline Oliveros (1932–2016), avant-garde composer, performance artist
 Gene O'Quin (1932–1978), country singer
 Wayne Oquin (born 1977), classical composer, music educator
 Roy Orbison (1936–1988), singer-songwriter
 K. T. Oslin (born 1941), country singer-songwriter
 Tommy Overstreet (1937–2015), country singer
 Buck Owens (1929–2006), country singer

P–Q

 Hot Lips Page (1908–1954), jazz trumpeter, bandleader
 Knocky Parker (1918–1986), country/jazz pianist
 Dean Parks (born 1946), studio musician
 Vinnie Paul (Abbott) (1964–2018), rock drummer, producer
 Glen Payne (1926–1999), gospel singer
 Leon Payne (1917–1969), country singer-songwriter
 Maurice Peress (1930–2017), classical conductor, educator
 Paul Peress (born 1959), jazz/world music drummer, composer, producer
 Chris Pérez (born 1969), rock guitarist, singer-songwriter
 Jay Perez (born 1963), Tejano singer-songwriter
 Jack Petersen (born 1933), jazz guitarist, educator
 Ray Peterson (1939–2005), pop singer
 Esther Phillips (1935–1984), R&B/jazz/pop/country singer
 Washington Phillips (1880–1954), gospel singer, instrumentalist
 Buster Pickens (1916–1964), blues pianist
 Patrice Pike (born 1970), rock/soul singer-songwriter-guitarist
 Ben J. Pierce (born 1999), YouTuber, singer-songwriter, actor 
 Pimp C (Chad Butler) (1973–2007), rapper 
 Mark Pirro (born 1970), rock bass player
 Harvey Pittel (born 1943), classical saxophonist
 Howard Pollack (born 1952), classical pianist, musicologist, author, professor
 Joe Poovey (1941–1998), rockabilly singer-songwriter
 The Powell Brothers (Taylor Powell and Blake Powell), country musicians
 Billy Preston (1946–2006), soul musician
 Johnny Preston (1939–2011), pop singer
 Ray Price (1926–2013), country singer
 Sammy Price (1908–1992), jazz/blues pianist, bandleader
 Toni Price (born 1961), country/blues singer
 Charley Pride (1938–2020), country singer
 P. J. Proby (born 1938), singer-songwriter, actor
 Chris Purdy (born 1972), pop/rock singer-songwriter
 Wynne Pyle (1881–1971), classical pianist
 Queen Ida (Ida Lewis Guillory) (born 1929), Creole/zydeco accordionist
 Abraham Quintanilla (born 1939), Tejano singer-songwriter, producer

R

 Ezra Rachlin (1915–1995), orchestra conductor, pianist
 RaeLynn (Racheal Lynn Woodward) (born 1994), country singer
 Gene Ramey (1913–1984), jazz double bassist
 Richard Ramirez, noise musician
 Willis Alan Ramsey (born 1951), country singer-songwriter
 Jon Randall (born 1969), country singer-songwriter
 Mickey Raphael (born 1951), country/rock harmonica player
 Leon Rausch (1927–2019), Western swing singer
 Tha Realest (Jevon Jones) (born 1974), rapper
 Marc Rebillet (born 1988), funk/hip-hop electronic musician
 Jaret Reddick (born 1972), punk singer-songwriter, guitarist, Bowling for Soup
 Dewey Redman (1931–2006), jazz saxophonist
 Goebel Reeves (1899–1959), folk singer
 Jim Reeves (1923–1964), country/pop singer-songwriter
 Claire Raphael Reis (1888–1978), classical music promoter, musicologist, educator
 Max Reiter (1905–1950), classical orchestra conductor
 Nicola Rescigno (1916–2008), opera conductor
 Timothy Rhea (born 1967), conductor, music educator
 Sonny Rhodes (born Clarence Edward Smith) (born 1940), blues singer, guitar player
 John Rich (born 1974), country music singer-songwriter
 J. P. (The Big Bopper) Richardson (1930–1959), rock-and-roll/country singer
 Jim Riggs (born 1941), saxophonist, educator
 Jeannie C. Riley (born 1945), country singer
 LeAnn Rimes (born 1982), country singer; born in Mississippi, but grew up in Garland
 Cowboy Slim Rinehart (1911–1948), country singer
 Tex Ritter (1905–1974), singer/ actor, father of actor John Ritter
 LaTavia Roberson (born 1981), singer
 Eck Robertson (1887–1975), country fiddler
 Don Robey (1903–1975), blues songwriter, record producer
 Hal Robinson (born 1952), classical string bass player
 Sharon Robinson (born 1949), concert cellist
 Emily Robison (born 1972), country singer-songwriter (The Dixie Chicks)
 Jimmie Rodgers (1897–1933), country singer
 Carrie Rodriguez (born 1978), folk singer-songwriter, fiddler
 Danny Rodriguez (1967–1990), Christian rapper
 David Rodriguez (1952–2015), folk singer-songwriter
 Johnny Rodriguez (born 1951), country singer
 Omar Rodríguez-López (born 1975), Dub and Progressive rock musician
 Robert Xavier Rodríguez (born 1946), classical composer
 Herbert Rogers (1929–1983), classical pianist and teacher
 Kenny Rogers (1938–2020), country singer-songwriter
 Randy Rogers, country singer
 Gene Roland (1921–1982), jazz composer, musician
 A. Clyde Roller (1914–2005), conductor and music educator
 Moreland Kortkamp Roller (1916–2006), classical pianist and teacher
 Lulu Roman (born 1947), country/gospel singer, comedian
 Kelly Rowland (born 1981), R&B singer-songwriter, dancer, actress
 Corey Rozzoni (born 1973), rock guitarist (Burden Brothers)
 Nancy Rumbel (born 1951), classical/new-age oboist, ocarina player, won Grammy Award
 Tim Rushlow (born 1966), country musician
 Mike Ryan (born 1988), country singer-songwriter, guitarist

Sa–Sm

 Doug Sahm (1941–1999), Tejano musician-songwriter
 Carl St. Clair (born 1952), orchestra conductor
 Sandra St. Victor (born 1963), R&B/soul/jazz singer-songwriter
 St. Vincent (Annie Clark) (born 1982), pop singer-songwriter, instrumentalist
 Olga Samaroff (1880–1948), classical pianist and teacher
 Joe Sample (1939–2014), jazz pianist, composer
 Domingo "Sam" Samudio (born 1937), rock 'n' roll musician, bandleader, entertainer ("Sam the Sham")
 George Sanger (born 1957), video-game music composer
 Stephanie Sant'Ambrogio (born 1960), violinist
 Simon Sargon (born 1938), classical composer, pianist, conductor
 Ray Sasaki (born 1948), trumpet player, educator
 Leslie Satcher (born 1962), country and bluegrass singer
 Billy Jack Saucier (1931–1987), country fiddler
 Boz Scaggs (born 1944), singer-songwriter
 Tony Scalzo (born 1964), pop/rock singer-songwriter, guitarist
 Scarface (born 1970), rapper
 Haley Scarnato (born 1982), American Idol (season 6) finalist (8th place)
 Wally Scharold (born 1978), classical/rock composer, instrumentalist, singer
 Harvey Schmidt (1929–2018), musical theatre composer (The Fantasticks)
 Eduard Schmieder (born 1948), classical violinist, teacher
 David Schnaufer (1952–2006), folk dulcimer player, music educator
 Emil Schuhmann (1856–1937), accordionist, bandleader, folk artist
 Jerry Scoggins (1911–2004), country singer
 Kendrick Scott (born 1980), jazz drummer, bandleader, composer
 Travis Scott (Jacques Webster Jr.) (born 1992), hip hop recording artist, music producer
 Joe Scruggs (born 1951), retired children's and folk singer-songwriter
 Dan Seals (1948–2009), rock/country musician (England Dan & John Ford Coley)
 Jim Seals (1941–2022), soft-rock musician (Seals and Crofts)
 Lynn Seaton (born 1957), jazz bassist, educator
 Selena (Selena Quintanilla) (1971–1995), Tejano/pop singer
 Jason Sellers (born 1971), country singer-songwriter
 Arban Severin (born 1976), composer of electronic music, film scores; producer
 Charlie Sexton (born 1968), rock guitarist, singer-songwriter
 Peter Seymour (born 1977), jazz/classical double bassist
 Allen Shamblin (born 1959), country songwriter
 Ray Sharpe (born 1938), rockabilly singer-songwriter, guitarist
 Billy Joe Shaver (1939–2020), country singer-songwriter
 Robert Shaw (1908–1985), blues pianist
 Bob (1909–1983), Joe (1911–1980), and Merle Shelton (1917–1982), country musicians, The Shelton Brothers
 Chad Shelton (born 1971), opera singer
 Harry Sheppard (1928–2022), jazz vibraphonist
 John Sheridan (born 1946), jazz pianist
 Amanda Shires (born 1982), country singer-songwriter, fiddler
 Michelle Shocked (born 1962), singer-songwriter, musician
 Jade Simmons (born 1977), classical pianist; was also Miss Illinois
 Ashlee Simpson (born 1984), singer
 Jessica Simpson (born 1980), singer
 Frankie Lee Sims (1917–1970), blues singer-songwriter, guitarist
 Lori Singer (born 1957), classical cellist (better known as actress)
 Thomas Sleeper (born 1956), classical composer, conductor
 Slim Thug (born 1980), rapper
 Brinton Averil Smith (born 1969), classical cellist
 Buster Smith (1904–1991), jazz saxophonist
 Chris "Frenchie" Smith, pop/rock record producer, guitarist, songwriter
 Elliott Smith (1969–2003), rock singer-songwriter
 Granger Smith (born 1979), country singer-songwriter
 Julia Smith (1905–1989), composer, pianist, author
 Ruby Jane Smith (born 1994), bluegrass fiddler, singer-songwriter
 Tim Smith, rock instrumentalist
 Walter Smith III (born 1980), jazz saxophonist, composer

Sn–Sz

 Doak Snead (born 1949), singer-songwriter
 Ed Soph (born 1945), jazz drummer, educator
 J. D. Souther (born 1945), country/rock singer-songwriter, instrumentalist
 Billie Jo Spears (1937–2011), country singer
 Victoria Spivey (1906–1976), blues singer-songwriter
 SPM (Carlos Coy) (born 1970), Chicano rapper
 Terry Stafford (1941–1996), country/pop singer-songwriter
 Megan Thee Stallion (born 1995), rapper
 Kay Starr (1922–2016), pop/jazz singer
 Red Steagall (born 1938), country singer-songwriter, actor
 Lanny Steele (1933–1994), jazz pianist, music educator, composer, jazz festival promoter
 Daniel Sternberg (1913–2000), classical conductor, composer, educator
 B. W. Stevenson (1949–1998), country/pop singer-songwriter
 Stephen Stills (born 1945), singer-songwriter
 Sly Stone (Sylvester Stewart) (born 1943), soul/funk singer-songwriter (Sly and the Family Stone)
 George Strait (born 1952), country singer
 Nikki Stringfield (born 1990), guitarist for The Iron Maidens and Before the Mourning
 Steven Stucky (1949–2016), Pulitzer Prize-winning classical composer
 Eric Stuer (1953–2008), drummer
 Lacey Nicole Sturm (born 1981), Alternative metal, Post-grunge, Hard rock Flyleaf
 Deanna Summers (born 1940), songwriter, born in Mississippi
 Gene Summers (1939–2021), rock 'n roll singer ("School of Rock 'n Roll", "Big Blue Diamonds")
 DJ Sun (born 1966), record producer, DJ
 Helen Sung (born 1970), jazz pianist
 Doug Supernaw (1960–2020), country singer-songwriter
 Jeffrey Swann (born 1951), classical pianist
 Sunny Sweeney (born 1976), country music singer

T–V

 Horace Tapscott (1934–1999), jazz pianist, composer
 Buddy Tate (1913–2001), jazz saxophonist
 Jacqueline Taylor (born 1985), Broadway/cabaret singer, actress
 Johnnie Taylor (1937–2000), soul/pop singer, DJ
 Will Taylor (born 1968), jazz/rock/pop/country violist, violinist, arranger, composer, producer, guitarist
 Charlie Teagarden (1913–1984), jazz trumpeter
 Jack Teagarden (1905–1964), jazz trombonist and bandleader
 Norma Teagarden (1911–1996), jazz pianist
 Alfred Teltschik (1918–2009), classical pianist and teacher
 Owen Temple (born 1976), folk/country singer-songwriter, instrumentalist
 Joe Tex (Joseph Arrington Jr.) (1935–1982), soul singer-songwriter
 Texas Ruby (Ruby Owens) (1908–1963), country singer
 Christopher Theofanidis (born 1967), classical composer
 B. J. Thomas (1942–2021), country singer-songwriter
 George W. Thomas (1885 – c. 1930), jazz pianist, songwriter
 Henry Thomas (1874 – c. 1950), blues/ragtime singer-songwriter
 Hersal Thomas (1906–1926), blues pianist, composer
 Benny Thomasson (1909–1984), country fiddler
 Hank Thompson (1925–2007), country singer-songwriter
 William Ennis Thomson (1927–2019), music educator
 Big Mama Thornton (1926–1984), R&B singer-songwriter
 Frank Ticheli (born 1958), classical composer
 Neal Tiemann (born 1982), David Cook's rock band guitarist
 Floyd Tillman (1914–2003), country guitarist, singer
 Martha Tilton (1915–2006), swing/pop singer
 Albert Tipton (1917–1997), classical flutist
 Louise Tobin (1918–2022), jazz singer
 Matt Tolentino (born 1985), musician specializing in pre-swing music
 Chris Tomlin (born 1972), singer-songwriter
 Tommy & The Tom Toms, aka Bill Smith Combo, DFW rock 'n roll group
 Tone (Tony Chung) (born 1983), pop guitarist (Cool Silly)
 Mitchell Torok (1929–2017?), country singer-songwriter
 Patsy Torres (born 1957), Tejano singer
 Don Tosti (1923–2004), Latin, R&B, swing, jazz, classical bassist, pianist
 Alphonse Trent (1905–1959), jazz pianist, bandleader
 Michael Trimble (born 1938), opera singer, teacher
 Robyn Troup (born 1988), R&B/pop/soul singer
 Ernest Tubb (1914–1984), country singer-songwriter
 Justin Tubb (1935–1998), country singer-songwriter
 Tanya Tucker (born 1958), country singer
 Fisher Tull (1934–1994), composer and educator
 "Blue" Gene Tyranny (born 1945), avant-garde composer
 Steve Tyrell (born 1944), pop singer, music producer
 Alexander Uninsky (1910–1972), concert pianist and teacher
 Tim Urban (born 1989), pop singer
 Usher (Usher Raymond IV) (born 1978), R&B and pop singer
 Mary Jeanne van Appledorn (1927–2014), composer and educator
 Frank Van der Stucken (1858–1929), conductor, composer; founder of Cincinnati Symphony Orchestra
 Vanilla Ice (born 1968), rapper
 Paul van Katwijk (1885–1974), pianist, conductor, composer, educator
 Viola Van Katwijk (1894–1980), pianist, composer, educator
 Townes Van Zandt (1944–1997), country singer-songwriter
 Jimmie Vaughan (born 1951), blues/rock guitarist, singer
 Stevie Ray Vaughan (1954–1990), musician
 Jaci Velasquez (born 1979), Contemporary Christian Latin pop singer
 Carl Venth (1860–1938), composer, conductor, violinist, music educator
 William VerMeulen (born 1961), classical horn player
 Vladimir Viardo (born 1949), classical pianist and teacher
 Rita Vidaurri (1924–2019), Tejana singer
 Tiffany Villarreal, R&B and hip hop singer
 Eddie Vinson (1917–1988), blues saxophonist
 Emmett Vokes (1928–2019), classical pianist and teacher

W–Z

 Billy Walker (1929–2006), country singer-songwriter
 Charlie Walker (1926–2008), country singer-songwriter
 Chris Walker, R&B/jazz singer, bass guitarist
 Cindy Walker (1918–2006), country singer-songwriter
 Django Walker (born 1981), country/rock singer-songwriter
 Esther Walker (1894–1943), blues singer, musical comedy actress
 Jerry Jeff Walker (1942–2020), country singer-songwriter
 T-Bone Walker (1910–1975), blues musician
 William Walker (1931–2010), opera singer
 Paul Wall (born 1980), rapper
 Sippie Wallace (1898–1986), blues singer-songwriter
 Don Walser (1934–2006), country singer, guitarist
 Cedar Walton (1934–2013), jazz pianist
 Mercy Dee Walton (1915–1962), blues pianist, singer-songwriter
 Jonathan Ware (born 1984), classical pianist
 Chris Waters, country singer-songwriter
 Dale Watson (born 1962), country singer
 Gene Watson (born 1943), country singer
 Johnny "Guitar" Watson (1935–1996), blues guitarist, singer
 WC (born 1970), rapper from Westside Connection
 Katie Webster (1936–1999), blues pianist
 Julius Weiss (c. 1841–19??), music professor, mentor to Scott Joplin
 Michael Weiss (born 1958), jazz composer and pianist
 Dan Welcher (born 1948), composer, music educator, bassoonist
 Emily Wells (born 1981), hip-hop/classical violinist
 James Westfall (born 1981), jazz vibraphonist, keytarist
 William Westney (born 1947), classical pianist, teacher
 Barry White (1944–2003), soul singer and record producer
 J. White Did It (born 1984), hip hop record producer, songwriter, and DJ
 Michael White (1933–2016), jazz violinist
 Chris Whitley (1960–2005), blues singer-songwriter, guitarist
 Buddy Whittington (born 1956), blues/rock guitarist
 Mike Wiebe, musician (The Riverboat Gamblers), actor, and stand-up comedian
 Rusty Wier (1944–2009), country/folk singer-songwriter
 Marijohn Wilkin (1920–2006), country songwriter
 Slim Willet (Winston Moore) (1919–1966), country singer-songwriter, DJ
 Willie D (William Dennis) (born 1966), rapper
 Clifton Williams (1923–1976), composer, educator
 Dave Williams (1972–2002), rock singer
 Don Williams (1939–2017), country singer-songwriter
 Lew Williams (1934–2019), rockabilly singer-songwriter
 Otis Williams (born 1941), singer with The Temptations
 Richard Williams (1931–1985), jazz trumpeter
 Roosevelt Williams (1903–1996), blues pianist
 Zane Williams (born 1977), country singer-songwriter
 Bob Wills (1905–1975), country singer with The Texas Playboys
 Johnnie Lee Wills (1912–1984), Western swing fiddler
 Dooley Wilson (1886 or 1894–1953), blues/jazz pianist, bandleader; actor
 Hop Wilson (1927–1975), blues steel guitarist
 J. Frank Wilson (1941–1991), pop singer, J. Frank Wilson and the Cavaliers
 Kim Wilson (born 1951), blues singer, harmonica player, The Fabulous Thunderbirds
 Teddy Wilson (1912–1986), jazz pianist
 U.P. Wilson (1934–2004), blues guitarist, singer
 Edgar Winter (born 1946), jazz/blues/rock musician
 Johnny Winter (1944–2014), blues guitarist
 Jonathan M. Wolfert (born 1952), composer, producer of radio jingles
 Lee Ann Womack (born 1966), country singer-songwriter
 Darren Keith Woods (born 1958), opera company director, singer
 Bernard Wright (1963–2022), funk/jazz keyboardist, singer
 Lammar Wright Sr. (1907–1973), jazz trumpeter
 Leo Wright (1933–1991), jazz instrumentalist
 Roger Wright (born 1974), classical pianist
 Jimmy Wyble (1922–2010), jazz/swing guitarist
 Cindy Yen (born 1986), pop singer-songwriter
 Sydney Youngblood (born 1960), dance/funk singer
 Camille Zamora (born 1970), classical singer
 Nancy Zhou (born 1993), classical violinist
 Jessica Zhu (born 1986), classical pianist

Beauty pageant winners

 Shirley Cothran (born 1955), Miss America 1975
 Candice Crawford (born 1986), beauty queen, winner of Miss Missouri USA, competed in the Miss Texas Teen USA pageant and the Miss USA pageant
 Brooke Daniels (born 1986), Miss Texas USA 2009
 Jo-Carroll Dennison (1923–2021), Miss America 1942
 Danielle Doty (born 1993), Miss Teen USA 2011
 Alyssa Edwards (Justin Johnson) (born 1980), drag performer, Miss Gay USofA 2006, Miss Gay America 2010
 Magen Ellis (born 1986), Miss Texas USA, Miss Texas Teen USA
 Christy Fichtner (born 1962), Miss USA 1986
 R'Bonney Gabriel (born 1994), Miss USA 2022
 Phyllis George (1949–2020), Miss America 1971
 Courtney Gibbs (born 1966), Miss USA 1988
 Kandace Krueger (born 1976), Miss USA 2001
 Debra Maffett (born 1956), Miss America 1983
 Melissa Marse (born 1974), Texas' Junior Miss 1991, concert pianist
 Laura Martinez-Harring (born 1964), Miss USA 1985
 Asia O'Hara (born 1982), drag performer, Miss Gay America 2016
 Gretchen Polhemus (born 1965), Miss USA 1989
 Michelle Royer (born 1966), Miss USA 1987
 Jade Simmons (born 1977), classical pianist; was also Miss Illinois
 Chelsi Smith (1973–2018), Miss USA 1995 and Miss Universe 1995
 Candice Stewart (born 1984), Miss American Teen, Miss Louisiana Teen USA, Miss Louisiana USA
 Crystle Stewart (born 1981), Miss USA 2008
 Linda Stouffer (born 1970), Texas' Junior Miss 1988, television journalist
 Kimberly Tomes (born 1956), Miss USA 1977
 Paola Turbay (born 1970), Miss Colombia, first runner-up for Miss Universe, model, actress
 Christie Lee Woods (born 1977), Miss Teen USA 1996
 Cindy Yen (born 1986), Miss Chinatown USA 2009

Other

 Amouranth (Kaitlyn Michelle Siragusa) (born 1993), female model, streamer and Internet celebrity
 Barbette (Vander Clyde Broadway) (1899–1973), female impersonator, aerialist
 Eric July (born 1990), rap-metal vocalist, political commentator, comic book writer

Sportspeople

Baseball
A–F

 Matt Albers (born 1983), relief pitcher for the Chicago White Sox
 Brandon Allen (born 1986), infielder for the Tampa Bay Rays
 Brett Anderson (born 1988), starting pitcher for the Colorado Rockies
 Jake Arrieta (born 1986), starting pitcher for the Chicago Cubs
 Scott Atchison (born 1976), relief pitcher for the Boston Red Sox
 Homer Bailey (born 1986), starting pitcher for the Cincinnati Reds
 Anthony Banda (born 1993), starting pitcher for the Arizona Diamondbacks 
 Jeff Banister (born 1964), former catcher for the Pittsburgh Pirates, current manager for the Texas Rangers
 Ernie Banks (1931–2015), Baseball Hall of Famer
 Daniel Bard (born 1985), relief pitcher for the Boston Red Sox
 Blake Beavan (born 1989), starting pitcher for the Seattle Mariners
 Chad Beck (born 1985), relief pitcher for the Toronto Blue Jays
 Josh Beckett (born 1980), baseball, Los Angeles Dodgers, pitcher, MVP of the 2003 World Series
 Lance Berkman (born 1976), first baseman and outfielder
 Michael Bourn (born 1982), center fielder for the Atlanta Braves
 Drake Britton (born 1989), relief pitcher for the Boston Red Sox
 Zach Britton (born 1987), relief pitcher for the New York Yankees
 Jay Bruce (born 1987), outfielder for the Philadelphia Phillies
 Clay Buchholz (born 1984), baseball, Arizona Diamondbacks, pitcher, threw a no hitter in just his second MLB start
 Jorge Cantú (born 1982), infielder for the San Diego Padres
 Matt Carpenter (born 1985), infielder for the St. Louis Cardinals
 Norm Cash (1934–1986), MLB first baseman, primarily for the Detroit Tigers
 Andrew Cashner (born 1986), starting pitcher for the Texas Rangers
 Randy Choate (born 1975), relief pitcher for the St. Louis Cardinals
 Preston Claiborne (born 1988), relief pitcher for the New York Yankees
 Roger Clemens (born 1962), baseball pitcher, seven-time Cy Young Award winner
 Andy Cohen (1904–1988), baseball second baseman and coach
 Clay Condrey (born 1975), relief pitcher for the Minnesota Twins
 Carl Crawford (born 1981), outfielder for the Los Angeles Dodgers
 John Danks (born 1985), starting pitcher for the Chicago White Sox
 Chris Davis (born 1986), first baseman for the Baltimore Orioles
 Sam Demel (born 1985), relief pitcher for the Arizona Diamondbacks
 Doug Drabek (born 1962), former Cy Young-winning MLB pitcher
 Kyle Drabek (born 1987), relief pitcher for the Toronto Blue Jays
 Justin Duchscherer (born 1977), starting pitcher for the Baltimore Orioles
 Dave Duncan (born 1945), pitching coach for the St. Louis Cardinals
 Adam Dunn (born 1979), All-Star player for the Chicago White Sox
 Tyler Duffey (born 1990), relief pitcher for the Minnesota Twins
 Zach Duke (born 1983), relief pitcher for the St. Louis Cardinals
 Jon Edwards (born 1988), relief pitcher for the San Diego Padres
 Nathan Eovaldi (born 1990), starting pitcher for the New York Yankees
 Taylor Featherston (born 1989), infielder for the Los Angeles Angels
 Brandon Finnegan (born 1993), relief pitcher for the Cincinnati Reds
 Bill Foster (1904–1978), Baseball Hall of Fame pitcher
 Steve Foster (born 1966), bullpen coach for the Kansas City Royals
 Sam Freeman (born 1987), relief pitcher for the Atlanta Braves
 David Freese (born 1983), third baseman for the Los Angeles Dodgers

G–M

 Yovani Gallardo (born 1986), starting pitcher for the Texas Rangers
 Ron Gant (born 1965), former MLB outfielder and second baseman
 Jaime García (born 1986), starting pitcher for the New York Yankees 
 Cito Gaston (born 1944), former MLB center fielder and manager for the Toronto Blue Jays
 Evan Gattis (born 1986), player for the Houston Astros
 John Gibbons (born 1962), manager for the Toronto Blue Jays
 Ryan Goins (born 1988), infielder for the Toronto Blue Jays
 Paul Goldschmidt (born 1987), first baseman for the Arizona Diamondbacks
 Greg Golson (born 1985), former MLB outfielder 
 Michael Gonzalez (born 1978), relief pitcher for the Baltimore Orioles
 Brian Gordon (born 1978), former MLB starting pitcher
 Jeff Gray (born 1981), former MLB relief pitcher 
 Will Harris (born 1984), relief pitcher for the Houston Astros
 Brad Hawpe (born 1979), former MLB outfielder
 Danny Heep (born 1957), former MLB outfielder who played with several teams
 Chris Herrmann (born 1987), catcher, outfielder, and first baseman for the Arizona Diamondbacks
 Jordan Hicks (born 1996), pitcher for the St. Louis Cardinals
 Trey Hillman (born 1963), bench coach for the Houston Astros
 Bryan Holaday (born 1987), catcher for the Texas Rangers
 Brock Holt (born 1988), utility player for the Boston Red Sox
 Joe Horlen (1937–2022), All Star starting pitcher
 Rogers Hornsby (1896–1963), Hall of Fame infielder, manager; .358 career batting average, two-time NL MVP, earned two Triple Crowns, All-Century Team, first-team MLB All-Time Team
 Aubrey Huff (born 1976), former MLB infielder and outfielder
 Chad Huffman (born 1985), outfielder for the Cleveland Indians
 Philip Humber (born 1982), starting pitcher for the Oakland Athletics
 Jason Hursh (born 1991), relief pitcher for the Atlanta Braves
 Austin Jackson (born 1987), center fielder for the Cleveland Indians
 Conor Jackson (born 1982), former MLB outfielder
 Paul Janish (born 1982), shortstop for the Baltimore Orioles
 Kelly Johnson (born 1982), utility player for the New York Mets
 Gary Jones (born 1960), third base and infield coach for the Chicago Cubs
 Nate Karns (born 1987), starting pitcher for the Tampa Bay Rays
 Scott Kazmir (born 1984), starting pitcher for the Houston Astros
 Ty Kelly (born 1988), American-Israeli utility player
 Steve Kemp (born 1954), former outfielder, primarily with the Detroit Tigers
 Kyle Kendrick (born 1984), starting pitcher for the Colorado Rockies
 Clayton Kershaw (born 1988), starting pitcher for the Los Angeles Dodgers
 Corey Kluber (born 1986), starting pitcher for the Cleveland Indians
 Chuck Knoblauch (born 1968), former second baseman, played primarily with the Minnesota Twins and the New York Yankees
 John Lackey (born 1978), starting pitcher for the Chicago Cubs
 Ryan Langerhans (born 1980), outfielder for the Seattle Mariners
 Scott Linebrink (born 1976), former MLB pitcher 
 Grady Little (born 1950), former baseball manager of the Los Angeles Dodgers, and Boston Red Sox
 Boone Logan (born 1984), relief pitcher for the Cleveland Indians
 James Loney (born 1984), first baseman for the Tampa Bay Rays
 Mark Lowe (born 1983), relief pitcher for the Toronto Blue Jays
 Tyler Lyons (born 1988), relief pitcher for the New York Yankees
 Greg Maddux (born 1966), Hall of Fame pitcher, primarily with the Chicago Cubs and Atlanta Braves
 Jeff Manship (born 1985), relief pitcher for the Cleveland Indians
 Robert Manuel (born 1983), relief pitcher for the Cincinnati Reds and Boston Red Sox
 Chris Martin (born 1986), relief pitcher for the New York Yankees
 Dustin May (born 1997), relief pitcher for the Los Angeles Dodgers
 Andrew McKirahan (born 1990), relief pitcher for the Atlanta Braves
 Jon Meloan (born 1984), former MLB pitcher 
 Ryan Merritt (born 1992), starting pitcher for the Cleveland Indians
 Shelby Miller (born 1990), pitcher for the Arizona Diamondbacks
 Hoby Milner (born 1991), pitcher for the Tampa Bay Rays
 A. J. Minter (born 1993), relief pitcher for the Atlanta Braves
 Adam Moore (born 1984), catcher for the Cleveland Indians
 Jim Morris (born 1964), MLB player and oldest rookie
 Max Muncy (born 1990), infielder for the Los Angeles Dodgers
 David Murphy (born 1981), left fielder for the Cleveland Indians

N–R

 Tyler Naquin (born 1991), outfielder for the Cleveland Indians
 Joe Nathan (born 1974), relief pitcher for the Detroit Tigers
 Jeff Newman (born 1948), MLB All-Star baseball player for the Oakland A's and Boston Red Sox and manager
 Jeff Niemann (born 1983), starting pitcher for the Tampa Bay Rays
 Jayson Nix (born 1982), utility player for the New York Yankees
 Logan Ondrusek (born 1985), relief pitcher for the Cincinnati Reds
 Troy Patton (born 1985), relief pitcher for the Baltimore Orioles
 Hunter Pence (born 1983), right fielder for the San Francisco Giants
 Cliff Pennington (born 1984), infielder for the Toronto Blue Jays
 Andy Pettitte (born 1972), former starting pitcher for the New York Yankees and Houston Astros
 Colin Poche (born 1994), relief pitcher for the Tampa Bay Rays
 Ryan Pressly (born 1988), pitcher for the Houston Astros
 David Purcey (born 1982), relief pitcher for the Detroit Tigers
 Robert Ray (born 1984), relief pitcher for the Toronto Blue Jays
 Anthony Rendon (born 1990), infielder for the Washington Nationals
 Craig Reynolds (born 1952), former MLB shortstop, primarily with the Houston Astros
 Arthur Rhodes (born 1969), former MLB pitcher 
 Will Rhymes (born 1983), second baseman for the Tampa Bay Rays
 Frank Robinson (1935–2019), won Triple Crown in both National League and American League, hit 586 career home runs, and was the first black manager in the Major Leagues
 Fernando Rodriguez (born 1984), relief pitcher for the Oakland Athletics
 David Rollins (born 1989), relief pitcher for the Seattle Mariners
 Chance Ruffin (born 1988), former MLB relief pitcher for the Seattle Mariners and Detroit Tigers
 Justin Ruggiano (born 1982), outfielder for the Seattle Mariners
 Nick Rumbelow (born 1991), relief pitcher for the New York Yankees
 Nolan Ryan (born 1947), Baseball Hall of Famer
 Reid Ryan (born 1971), president of the Houston Astros, son of Nolan Ryan

S–Z

 Bo Schultz (born 1985), relief pitcher for the Toronto Blue Jays
 Kelly Shoppach (born 1980), former MLB catcher for several teams
 Matthew Silverman (born 1976), general manager and President for Baseball Operations for the Tampa Bay Rays
 Kevin Slowey (born 1984), former MLB starting pitcher for the Minnesota Twins and Miami Marlins
 Burch Smith (born 1990), pitcher for the Tampa Bay Rays
 Carson Smith (born 1989), closer for the Seattle Mariners
 Chris Snyder (born 1981), former MLB catcher 
 Kyle Snyder (born 1977), pitching coach for the Tampa Bay Rays
 Zach Stewart (born 1986), former MLB pitcher 
 Monty Stratton (1912–1982), pitcher for the Chicago White Sox
 Huston Street (born 1983), closer for the Los Angeles Angels
 Ross Stripling (born 1989), relief pitcher for the Los Angeles Dodgers
 Drew Stubbs (born 1984), center fielder for the Texas Rangers
 Greg Swindell (born 1965), MLB pitcher for 17 seasons
 Blake Swihart (born 1992), catcher for the Boston Red Sox
 Jordan Tata (born 1981), former MLB pitcher
 Taylor Teagarden (born 1983), catcher for the Chicago Cubs
 Garry Templeton (born 1956), former MLB shortstop
 Ryan Tepera (born 1987), relief pitcher for the Toronto Blue Jays
 Jess Todd (born 1986), former MLB pitcher 
 Shawn Tolleson (born 1988), closer for the Texas Rangers
 Josh Tomlin (born 1984), relief pitcher for the Atlanta Braves
 Anthony Vasquez (born 1986), starting pitcher for the Seattle Mariners
 Randy Velarde (born 1962), former MLB infielder and utility player, primarily with the New York Yankees
 Jordan Walden (born 1987), pitcher for the St. Louis Cardinals
 Vernon Wells (born 1978), three-time All-Star outfielder for the Toronto Blue Jays
 Austen Williams (born 1992), pitcher for the Washington Nationals
 Smokey Joe Williams (1886–1951), baseball great
 Chris Withrow (born 1989), relief pitcher for the Atlanta Braves
 Brandon Wood (born 1985), third baseman and shortstop for the Los Angeles Angels
 Kerry Wood (born 1977), former MLB relief pitcher
 Brandon Workman (born 1988), starting pitcher for the Boston Red Sox
 Anthony Young (born 1966), former MLB pitcher
 Chris Young (born 1979), pitcher for the Kansas City Royals
 Chris Young (born 1983), outfielder for the New York Yankees

Basketball

A–M

 Quincy Acy (born 1990), forward for the Dallas Mavericks
 LaMarcus Aldridge (born 1985), NBA player, San Antonio Spurs, power forward
 Chris Andersen (born 1978), power forward/center for the Miami Heat
 Darrell Arthur (born 1988), power forward for the Denver Nuggets
 Maceo Baston (born 1976), former professional basketball player, power forward
 Tony Battie (born 1976), former NBA power forward/center
 Zelmo Beaty (1939–2013), former NBA player, member of Basketball Hall of Fame
 Peter Berry (born 2001), wheelchair basketball player for Alabama Crimson Tide
 Bill Blakeley (1934–2010), Head Coach, Dallas Chaparrals, University of North Texas
 Mookie Blaylock (born 1967), former NBA point guard
 Chris Bosh (born 1984), NBA player, Miami Heat, power forward
 J'Covan Brown (born 1990), basketball player in the Israel Basketball Premier League
 Jimmy Butler (born 1989), small forward/shooting guard for the Philadelphia 76ers
 Kaleb Canales (born 1978), assistant coach for the Dallas Mavericks
 T. J. Cline (born 1994), American-Israeli basketball player
Michael Cobbins (born 1992), basketball player for Maccabi Haifa of the Israeli Basketball Premier League
 Charli Collier (born 1999), WNBA player, No. 1 pick of 2021 WNBA draft
 Jody Conradt (born 1941), head coach for UT's Lady Longhorns
 Christian Cunningham (born 1997), forward in the Israeli Basketball Premier League
 Clyde Drexler (born 1962), Hall of Fame swingman for the Portland Trail Blazers and the Houston Rockets
 Mike Dunleavy Jr. (born 1980), small forward/shooting guard for the Chicago Bulls
 Ndudi Ebi (born 1984), Nigerian basketball player
 Carsen Edwards (born 1998), player for the Boston Celtics
 Keenan Evans (born 1996), basketball player in the Israel Basketball Premier League
 T. J. Ford (born 1983), former NBA point guard
 Jeff Foster (born 1977), former NBA player
 Daniel Gibson (born 1986), point guard for the Cleveland Cavaliers
 Gerald Green (born 1986), shooting guard/small forward for the Houston Rockets
 Brittney Griner (born 1990), WNBA basketball player
James Gulley (born 1965), professional basketball player for Ironi Ramat Gan in the Israeli Basketball Premier League
 Terrel Harris (born 1987), guard for the Bakersfield Jam
 Grant Hill (born 1971), former seven-time NBA All-Star small forward
 Josh Huestis (born 1991), small forward for the Oklahoma City Thunder
 Stephen Jackson (born 1978), shooting guard/small forward for the San Antonio Spurs
 Wesley Johnson (born 1987), small forward/power forward for the Los Angeles Lakers
Chris Jones (born 1993), basketball player for Maccabi Tel Aviv of the Israeli Basketball Premier League 
Jalen Jones (born 1993), basketball player for Hapoel Haifa in the Israeli Basketball Premier League
 DeAndre Jordan (born 1988), center for the Los Angeles Clippers
 Luke Kornet (born 1995), player for the Chicago Bulls
Michale Kyser (born 1991), player for Hapoel Holon in the Israeli Basketball Premier League
 Monica Lamb-Powell (born 1964), player for Houston Comets
 Dave Lattin (born 1943), player for San Francisco Warriors/Phoenix Suns/Pittsburgh Condors/Memphis Tams
 Guy Lewis (1922–2015), Hall of Fame college basketball coach
 Rashard Lewis (born 1979), forward for the Miami Heat
 John Lucas III (born 1982), point guard for the Utah Jazz
 Slater Martin (1925–2012), NBA player, elected to Basketball Hall of Fame
 Wesley Matthews (born 1986), shooting guard for the Dallas Mavericks
 Jason Maxiell (born 1983), power forward for the Charlotte Hornets
 Taj McWilliams-Franklin (born 1970), WNBA basketball player, gold medalist, New York Liberty
 C. J. Miles (born 1987), forward for the Cleveland Cavaliers
 Eric Moreland (born 1991), power forward and center for the Toronto Raptors
 Randolph Morris (born 1986), center for the Beijing Ducks
 Gerald Myers (born 1945), basketball coach 1971–1991; athletic director, Texas Tech University

N–Z

 Eduardo Nájera (born 1976), former NBA player
Le'Bryan Nash (born 1992), player in the Israeli Basketball Premier League
Josh Nebo (born 1997), player in the Israeli Basketball Premier League
Rashard Odomes (born 1996), basketball player in the Israeli Basketball Premier League
 Emeka Okafor (born 1982), player for the Phoenix Suns
 Ike Ofoegbu (born 1984), American-Nigerian Israeli Premier Basketball League player
 Kevin Ollie (born 1972), former NBA point guard
 Shaquille O'Neal (born 1972), former NBA 15-time All-Star center
 Kendrick Perkins (born 1984), center for the Oklahoma City Thunder
 Terran Petteway (born 1992), guard/forward in the Israeli Basketball Premier League
 Dexter Pittman (born 1988), center for the Atlanta Hawks
 Ronnie Price (born 1983), point guard for the Orlando Magic
 Taurean Prince (born 1994), small forward for the Brooklyn Nets
 André Roberson (born 1991), player for the Oklahoma City Thunder
Taylor Rochestie (born 1985) American-Montenegrin player for Hapoel Haifa of the Israel Basketball Premier League
 Dennis Rodman (born 1961), former NBA forward, played primarily with the Detroit Pistons and Chicago Bulls
 Quinton Ross (born 1981), former NBA player
 Jason Siggers (born 1985), basketball player in the Israel Basketball Premier League
 Xavier Silas (born 1988), player for the Maccabi Ashdod B.C.
 Jonathon Simmons (born 1989), player for the San Antonio Spurs
 Odyssey Sims (born 1992), player for Baylor Lady Bears basketball
 Donald Sloan (born 1988), guard for the Indiana Pacers
 Ken Spain (1946–1990), player for Chicago Bulls/Pittsburgh Condors
 Sheryl Swoopes (born 1971), WNBA, Olympic gold medalist
 Elijah Thomas (born 1996), basketball player for Bnei Herzliya in the Israeli Basketball Premier League
 Kurt Thomas (born 1972), former NBA player
 Wayman Tisdale (1964–2009), NBA power forward
 Ben Uzoh (born 1988), point guard for the Canton Charge
 Willie Warren (born 1989), player for the Szolnoki Olaj KK
 Deron Williams (born 1984), point guard for the Dallas Mavericks
 Sean Williams (born 1986), power forward/center for the Selçuk Üniversitesi BK
 Tex Winter (1922–2018), former basketball coach, innovator of the triangle offense, Hall of Fame inductee
 Bracey Wright, basketball player, guard for the Minnesota Timberwolves, Israeli Basketball Premier League

Bodybuilding

 Heather Armbrust (born 1977), IFBB professional bodybuilder
 Tina Chandler (born 1974), IFBB professional bodybuilder
 Ronnie Coleman (born 1964), eight-time Mr. Olympia IFBB professional bodybuilder
 Laura Creavalle (born 1959), Guyanese-born Canadian/American professional bodybuilder
 Vickie Gates (born 1962), IFBB professional bodybuilder
 Kristy Hawkins (born 1980), IFBB professional bodybuilder
 Iris Kyle (born 1974), ten-time overall Ms. Olympia professional bodybuilder
 Colette Nelson (born 1974), IFBB professional bodybuilder
 Yaxeni Oriquen-Garcia (born 1966), IFBB professional bodybuilder
 Betty Pariso (born 1956), IFBB professional bodybuilder
 Denise Rutkowski (born 1961), IFBB professional bodybuilder
 Alana Shipp (born 1982), American-Israeli IFBB professional bodybuilder

Boxing

 Mike Ayala (born 1959), boxer
 Paulie Ayala (born 1970), world-champion boxer
 Tony Ayala Jr. (1963–2015), boxer
 Eric Carr (born 1975), Golden Gloves Champion   
 Ruben Castillo (born 1957 in Lubbock), boxer
 Randall "Tex" Cobb (born 1950), boxer, fought for world heavyweight title
 Curtis Cokes (1937–2020), world champion boxer 
 Bruce Curry (born 1956), world-champion boxer
 Donald Curry (born 1961), world-champion boxer
 Juan Díaz (born 1983), world-champion boxer
 Oscar Díaz (1982–2015), boxer
 Troy Dorsey (born 1962), world-champion boxer and kickboxer
 George Foreman (born 1949), heavyweight champion boxer, entrepreneur, Christian ordained minister
 Gene Hatcher (born 1958), world-champion boxer
 Jack Johnson (1878–1946), boxer, first black heavyweight champion
 Quincy Taylor (born 1963), world-champion boxer

Football
A–B

 Emmanuel Acho (born 1990), linebacker for Philadelphia Eagles
 Sam Acho (born 1988), linebacker for Arizona Cardinals
 Joseph Addai (born 1983), running back for Indianapolis Colts
 Eric Alexander (born 1982), linebacker for Jacksonville Jaguars
 Jared Allen (born 1982), defensive end for Chicago Bears
Lance Alworth (born 1940), wide receiver for San Diego Chargers, Dallas Cowboys
 Danny Amendola (born 1985), wide receiver, kickoff returner for New England Patriots
 Adrian Awasom (born 1983), defensive end for New York Giants, Minnesota Vikings
 Remi Ayodele (born 1983), defensive tackle for Minnesota Vikings
 Jonathan Babineaux (born 1981), defensive tackle for Atlanta Falcons
 Jordan Babineaux (born 1982), defensive back for Seattle Seahawks
 Stephen Baker (born 1964), wide receiver for New York Giants
 Joplo Bartu (born 1989), linebacker for Atlanta Falcons
 Arnaz Battle (born 1980), wide receiver for Pittsburgh Steelers
 Jackie Battle (born 1983), running back for Kansas City Chiefs
 Sammy Baugh (1914–2008), Hall of Fame quarterback, primarily with Washington Redskins
 Kelvin Beachum (born 1989), offensive lineman for Pittsburgh Steelers
 Cole Beasley (born 1989), wide receiver, return specialist for Buffalo Bills
 Byron Bell (born 1989), offensive tackle for Carolina Panthers
 Emory Bellard (1927–2011), college football coach
 Martellus Bennett (born 1987), tight end for New England Patriots
 Michael Bennett (born 1985), defensive end for Seattle Seahawks
 Cedric Benson (1982–2019), running back for Chicago Bears, Cincinnati Bengals
 Rocky Bernard (born 1979), defensive tackle for New York Giants
 Raymond Berry (born 1933), NFL split end, member of Pro Football Hall of Fame
 Justin Blalock (born 1983), offensive guard for Atlanta Falcons
 Rhett Bomar (born 1985), quarterback for New York Giants
 David Boston (born 1978), NFL wide receiver
 Kyle Bosworth (born 1986), outside linebacker for Dallas Cowboys
 Bobby Boyd (1937–2017), All-Pro defensive back, Baltimore Colts, Oklahoma Sooners
 Drew Brees (born 1979), quarterback for New Orleans Saints
 Mike Brisiel (born 1983), guard for Oakland Raiders
 Michael Brockers (born 1990), defensive tackle for St. Louis Rams
 Aaron Brown (born 1985), running back, return specialist for Detroit Lions
 Chykie Brown (born 1986), cornerback for Baltimore Ravens
 Kris Brown (born 1976), placekicker for San Diego Chargers
 Malcom Brown (born 1994), defensive tackle for New England Patriots
 Tarell Brown (born 1985), cornerback for San Francisco 49ers
 Dez Bryant (born 1988), wide receiver for Dallas Cowboys
 Matt Bryant (born 1975), placekicker for Atlanta Falcons
 Red Bryant (born 1984), defensive lineman for Jacksonville Jaguars
 Maury Buford (born 1960), NFL punter
 Melvin Bullitt (born 1984), defensive back for Indianapolis Colts
 Rex Burkhead (born 1990), running back for the New England Patriots

C–F

 Earl Campbell (born 1955), Pro Football Hall of Famer, Heisman Trophy winner
 Marcus Cannon (born 1988), offensive tackle for New England Patriots
 Rock Cartwright (born 1979), running back for Washington Redskins
 James Casey (born 1984), tight end for Philadelphia Eagles
 Juan Castillo (born 1959), defensive coordinator for Philadelphia Eagles
 Scott Chandler (born 1985), tight end for Buffalo Bills
 Jamaal Charles (born 1986), running back for Kansas City Chiefs
 Jeromey Clary (born 1983), offensive guard for San Diego Chargers
 Keenan Clayton (born 1987), outside linebacker for Oakland Raiders
 Perrish Cox (born 1987), cornerback, return specialist for San Francisco 49ers
 Michael Crabtree (born 1987), wide receiver for San Francisco 49ers
 Patrick Crayton (born 1979), wide receiver for San Diego Chargers
 Mason Crosby (born 1984), placekicker for Green Bay Packers
 John David Crow (1935–2015), athletic director for Texas A&M; NFL player and coach
 Andy Dalton (born 1987), quarterback for Cincinnati Bengals
 Chase Daniel (born 1986), quarterback for New Orleans Saints, Kansas City Chiefs
 Cody Davis (born 1989), safety for St. Louis Rams
 Knile Davis (born 1991), running back for Kansas City Chiefs
 Leonard Davis (born 1978), guard for Dallas Cowboys
 Phil Dawson (born 1975), placekicker for San Francisco 49ers
 Quintin Demps (born 1985), safety for New York Giants
 Ty Detmer (born 1967), NFL quarterback
 Eric Dickerson (born 1960), NFL running back and Pro Football Hall of Famer
 Zac Diles (born 1985), linebacker for Houston Texans
 Derrick Dockery (born 1980), guard for Dallas Cowboys
 Donald Driver (born 1975), wide receiver for Green Bay Packers
 Ron Edwards (born 1979), defensive tackle for Carolina Panthers
 Ikemefuna Enemkpali (born 1991), linebacker for Buffalo Bills
 Thomas Everett (born 1964), NFL safety and College Football Hall of Famer
 Jermichael Finley (born 1987), tight end for Green Bay Packers
 Cameron Fleming (born 1992), offensive tackle for New England Patriots
 Jamell Fleming (born 1989), cornerback for Kansas City Chiefs
 Larry Flowers (born 1958), NFL safety, primarily with New York Giants
 Matt Flynn (born 1985), quarterback for Green Bay Packers
 Nick Foles (born 1989), quarterback for Philadelphia Eagles, St. Louis Rams
 Justin Forsett (born 1985), running back for Seattle Seahawks
 Barry Foster (born 1968), NFL running back
 Jason Curtis Fox (born 1988), offensive tackle for Miami Dolphins
 Robert Francois (born 1985), linebacker for Green Bay Packers
 Jerrell Freeman (born 1986), linebacker for Indianapolis Colts

G–I

 Taylor Gabriel (born 1991), wide receiver for Atlanta Falcons
 Dylan Gandy (born 1982), center for Detroit Lions
 Roberto Garza (born 1979), guard for Chicago Bears
 Crockett Gillmore (born 1991), tight end for Baltimore Ravens
 Chris Givens (born 1989), wide receiver for Baltimore Ravens
 Bill Glass (1935–2021), defensive end, Detroit Lions, Cleveland Browns
 Cody Glenn (born 1986), linebacker for Indianapolis Colts
 Charles Godfrey (born 1985), safety/nickelback for Carolina Panthers
 Mike Goodson (born 1987), running back/kick returner for Oakland Raiders
 Marquise Goodwin (born 1990), wide receiver, kickoff returner for Buffalo Bills
 Josh Gordon (born 1991), wide receiver for New England Patriots
 Jakeem Grant (born 1992), wide receiver for Miami Dolphins
 Darrell Green (born 1960), NFL cornerback, member of Pro Football Hall of Fame
 "Mean Joe" Greene (born 1946), College and Pro Football Hall of Fame defensive tackle for Pittsburgh Steelers
 Jabari Greer (born 1982), cornerback for New Orleans Saints
 Forrest Gregg (1933–2019), Hall of Fame offensive tackle and head coach
 Robert Griffin III (born 1990), Heisman Trophy-winning NFL quarterback
 Andre Gurode (born 1978), center for Baltimore Ravens
 Bryce Hager (born 1992), linebacker for St. Louis Rams
 Ahmard Hall (born 1979), fullback for Tennessee Titans
 Casey Hampton (born 1977), nose tackle for Pittsburgh Steelers
 Phil Handler (1908–1968), NFL football player and coach
 Geoff Hangartner (born 1982), center and guard for Carolina Panthers
 Caleb Hanie (born 1985), quarterback for Chicago Bears
 Merton Hanks (born 1968), safety for San Francisco 49ers
 James Hanna (born 1989), tight end for Dallas Cowboys
 Graham Harrell (born 1985), quarterback for the Green Bay Packers
 Tommie Harris (born 1983), defensive tackle for Chicago Bears
 Garrett Hartley (born 1986), placekicker for New Orleans Saints
 David Hawthorne (born 1985), linebacker for New Orleans Saints
 Kellen Heard (born 1985), defensive end for Buffalo Bills
 Johnnie Lee Higgins (born 1983), wide receiver for Oakland Raiders
 Tony Hills (born 1984), offensive tackle for Dallas Cowboys
 Ellis Hobbs (born 1983), cornerback for Philadelphia Eagles
 Montrae Holland (born 1980), guard for Dallas Cowboys
 Ziggy Hood (born 1987), defensive end for Pittsburgh Steelers
 Rob Housler (born 1988), tight end for Arizona Cardinals
 Chris Houston (born 1984), cornerback for Atlanta Falcons
 Ken Houston (born 1944), Hall of Fame safety for Houston Oilers, Washington Redskins
 Thomas Howard (born 1983), linebacker for Oakland Raiders
 Josh Huff (born 1991), wide receiver for Philadelphia Eagles
 Michael Huff (born 1983), free safety for Oakland Raiders
 Jerry Hughes (born 1988), defensive end for Buffalo Bills
 Byron Hunt (born 1958), linebacker for New York Giants
 Phillip Hunt (born 1986), defensive end for Philadelphia Eagles
 Kendall Hunter (born 1988), running back for San Francisco 49ers
 Sam Hurd (born 1985), wide receiver for Dallas Cowboys
 Demontre Hurst (born 1991), cornerback for Chicago Bears
 Jalen Hurts (born 1998), quarterback for the Philadelphia Eagles
 Brian Iwuh (born 1984), linebacker for Chicago Bears

J–L

 Fred Jackson (born 1981), running back for Buffalo Bills
 Quentin Jammer (born 1979), cornerback for San Diego Chargers
 Tony Jerod-Eddie (born 1990), defensive end for San Francisco 49ers
 Luke Joeckel (born 1991), offensive tackle for Jacksonville Jaguars
 Charlie Johnson (born 1984), offensive tackle for Indianapolis Colts
 Chris Johnson (born 1979), cornerback for Baltimore Ravens
 Derrick Johnson (born 1982), linebacker for Kansas City Chiefs
 D. J. Johnson (born 1985), cornerback for New York Giants
 Jimmy Johnson (born 1943), NCAA and NFL head coach for Dallas Cowboys and Miami Dolphins, TV personality
 Lane Johnson (born 1990), offensive tackle for Philadelphia Eagles
 Manuel Johnson (born 1986), wide receiver for Dallas Cowboys
 Michael Johnson (born 1984), safety for New York Giants
 Johnny Jolly (born 1983), defensive end for Green Bay Packers
 Colin Jones (born 1987), safety for Carolina Panthers
 Darlene Jones (1953–2016), commissioner of Lone Star Football League
 Case Keenum (born 1988), quarterback for Minnesota Vikings, Houston Texans, St. Louis/Los Angeles Rams, Denver Broncos, Washington Redskins, Cleveland Browns, Buffalo Bills
 Sergio Kindle (born 1987), linebacker for Baltimore Ravens
 David King (born 1989), defensive end for Kansas City Chiefs
 Johnny Knox (born 1986), wide receiver for Chicago Bears
 Kevin Kolb (born 1984), quarterback for Arizona Cardinals
 Gary Kubiak (born 1961), quarterback and head coach for Denver Broncos
 Jacob Lacey (born 1987), cornerback for Indianapolis Colts
 Ernie Ladd (1938–2007), college and pro football player, professional wrestler
 Brandon LaFell (born 1986), wide receiver for New England Patriots
 Tom Landry (1924–2000), Hall of Fame head coach, Dallas Cowboys
 Dick "Night Train" Lane (1927–2002), Pro Football Hall of Fame cornerback
 Jeremy Lane (born 1990), cornerback for Seattle Seahawks
 Yale Lary (1930–2017), NFL Hall of Fame defensive back, punter for Detroit Lions; politician
 Bobby Layne (1926–1986), NFL quarterback and kicker, member of College Football Hall of Fame and Pro Football Hall of Fame
 Shane Lechler (born 1976), punter for Oakland Raiders
 Bob Lilly (born 1939), Hall of Fame defensive tackle for Dallas Cowboys
 Carl "Spider" Lockhart (1943–1986), defensive back for New York Giants
 Andrew Luck (born 1989), quarterback for Indianapolis Colts

M–O

 Patrick Mahomes (born 1995), quarterback for Kansas City Chiefs
 Ryan Mallett (born 1988), quarterback for Baltimore Ravens, New England Patriots
 Danieal Manning (born 1982), free safety for Chicago Bears
 Bradley Marquez (born 1992), wide receiver for St. Louis Rams
 Jake Matthews (born 1992), offensive tackle for Atlanta Falcons
 Brett Maxie (born 1962), defensive back, secondary coach for Dallas Cowboys
 Baker Mayfield (born 1995), NFL quarterback, Heisman Trophy winner
 Don Maynard (1935–2022), NFL wide receiver, member of Pro Football Hall of Fame
 Taylor Mays (born 1988), safety
 Trumaine McBride (born 1985), cornerback for New York Giants
 Brice McCain (born 1986), cornerback for Miami Dolphins
 Luke McCown (born 1981), quarterback for Atlanta Falcons
 Colt McCoy (born 1986), quarterback for Washington Redskins, Cleveland Browns
 Danny McCray (born 1988), defensive back, special teamer for Dallas Cowboys
 Vance McDonald (born 1990), tight end for San Francisco 49ers
 Stephen McGee (born 1985), quarterback for Dallas Cowboys
 Bo McMillin (1895–1952), NFL quarterback, head coach and College Football Hall of Famer
 Henry Melton (born 1986), defensive tackle for Dallas Cowboys
 "Dandy" Don Meredith (1938–2010), quarterback for Dallas Cowboys; actor and TV personality
 Christine Michael (born 1990), running back for Dallas Cowboys
 Roy Miller (born 1987), defensive tackle for Jacksonville Jaguars
 Von Miller (born 1989), outside linebacker for Denver Broncos
 Keavon Milton (born 1990), offensive lineman for Seattle Seahawks
 Earl Mitchell (born 1987), defensive tackle for Miami Dolphins
 Damontre Moore (born 1992), defensive end for New York Giants
 Denarius Moore (born 1988), wide receiver for Oakland Raiders
 Mike Morgan (born 1988), linebacker for Seattle Seahawks
 Sammy Morris (born 1977), running back for New England Patriots
 Mitch Morse (born 1992), center for Kansas City Chiefs
 Thomas Morstead (born 1986), punter for New Orleans Saints
 Marcus Murphy (born 1991), running back for New Orleans Saints
 Kyler Murray (born 1997), NFL quarterback, Heisman Trophy winner
 Dimitri Nance (born 1988), running back for Green Bay Packers
 Corey Nelson (born 1992), linebacker for Denver Broncos
 David Nelson (born 1986), wide receiver for Buffalo Bills
 Marshall Newhouse (born 1988), offensive tackle for New England Patriots
 Robert Newhouse (1950–2014), fullback for Dallas Cowboys
 Tommy Nobis (1943–2017), linebacker for Atlanta Falcons and College Football Hall of Famer
 Moran Norris (born 1978), fullback for San Francisco 49ers
 Cyril Obiozor (born 1986), linebacker for San Diego Chargers
 Alex Okafor (born 1991), linebacker for Arizona Cardinals
 Frank Okam (born 1985), defensive tackle for Houston Texans
 Russell Okung (born 1987), offensive tackle for Seattle Seahawks
Igor Olshansky (born 1982), National Football League player
 Brian Orakpo (born 1986), linebacker for Washington Redskins
 Zach Orr (born 1992), linebacker for Baltimore Ravens
 Kelechi Osemele (born 1989), offensive lineman for Baltimore Ravens

P–R

 Juqua Parker (born 1978), defensive end for Philadelphia Eagles
 Tyler Patmon (born 1991), cornerback for Dallas Cowboys
 Elvis Patterson (born 1960), NFL defensive back
 Charlie Peprah (born 1983), safety for Green Bay Packers
 Mac Percival (born 1940), placekicker for Dallas Cowboys and Chicago Bears
 Jason Peters (born 1982), offensive tackle for Philadelphia Eagles
 Adrian Peterson (born 1985), NFL running back for Minnesota Vikings and other teams
 Brandon Pettigrew (born 1985), tight end for Detroit Lions
 Bum Phillips (1923–2013), NFL head coach of Houston Oilers, New Orleans Saints
 Wade Phillips (born 1947), defensive coordinator of Los Angeles Rams, head coach of Denver Broncos, Buffalo Bills, Dallas Cowboys
 Christian Ponder (born 1988), quarterback for Minnesota Vikings
 Manny Ramirez (born 1983), guard/center for Denver Broncos
 Gary Reasons (born 1962), linebacker, primarily for New York Giants
 Cory Redding (born 1980), defensive end for Indianapolis Colts
 Weston Richburg (born 1991), offensive lineman for New York Giants
 Elandon Roberts (born 1994), linebacker for New England Patriots
 Aldrick Robinson (born 1988), wide receiver for Atlanta Falcons
 Khiry Robinson (born 1989), running back for New Orleans Saints
 Bradley Roby (born 1992), cornerback for Denver Broncos
 Jacquizz Rodgers (born 1990), running back for Atlanta Falcons
 Shaun Rogers (born 1979), defensive tackle for New Orleans Saints
 Aaron Ross (born 1982), cornerback for Jacksonville Jaguars
 Kyle Rote (1928–2002), All-American running back at SMU, NFL New York Giants wide receiver
 Stanford Routt (born 1983), NFL cornerback 
 Eric Rowe (born 1992), cornerback for New England Patriots
 Ryan Russell (born 1992), defensive end for Dallas Cowboys

S–T

 Emmanuel Sanders (born 1987), wide receiver for Denver Broncos
 Josh Scobee (born 1982), placekicker for Jacksonville Jaguars
 Jonathan Scott (born 1983), offensive tackle for Pittsburgh Steelers
 Derrick Shelby (born 1989), defensive end for Miami Dolphins
 Del Shofner (1934–2020), wide receiver for New York Giants, Los Angeles Rams; MVP of 1957 Sugar Bowl
 Ozzie Simmons (1914–2001), one of first black All-American players in 1930s
 John Skelton (born 1988), quarterback for Arizona Cardinals
 Bubba Smith (1945–2011), defensive end with Baltimore Colts, Oakland Raiders, Houston Oilers and actor
 Hunter Smith (born 1977), punter for Washington Redskins
 Kevin Smith (born 1970), cornerback for Dallas Cowboys
 Lovie Smith (born 1958), head coach for Chicago Bears, Tampa Bay Buccaneers, University of Illinois
 Wade Smith (born 1981), guard and center for Houston Texans
 Justin Snow (born 1976), long snapper for Indianapolis Colts
 Matthew Stafford (born 1988), quarterback for Detroit Lions
 Jarrett Stidham (born 1996), quarterback for New England Patriots
 Matt Stover (born 1968), placekicker for Indianapolis Colts
 Michael Strahan (born 1971), Hall of Fame defensive end for New York Giants; TV personality, Good Morning America, NFL on FOX, The $100,000 Pyramid
 Travis Swanson (born 1991), center for Detroit Lions
 Aqib Talib (born 1986), cornerback for Tampa Bay Buccaneers
 Ryan Tannehill (born 1988), quarterback for Miami Dolphins
 Phillip Tanner (born 1988), running back for Dallas Cowboys
 Charley Taylor (1941–2022), NFL wide receiver, member of Pro Football Hall of Fame
 Stepfan Taylor (born 1991), running back for Arizona Cardinals
 David Thomas (born 1983), tight end for New Orleans Saints
 Earl Thomas (born 1989), safety for Seattle Seahawks
 Michael Thomas (born 1989), safety for Miami Dolphins
 Mike Thomas (born 1987), wide receiver for Jacksonville Jaguars
 Thurman Thomas (born 1966), NFL running back, member of College Football Hall of Fame and Pro Football Hall of Fame
 Ted Thompson (1953–2021), general manager of Green Bay Packers
 Y. A. Tittle (1926–2017), Hall of Fame quarterback, primarily with San Francisco 49ers, New York Giants
 LaDainian Tomlinson (born 1979), NFL running back and College Football Hall of Famer
 Michael Toudouze (born 1983), offensive tackle for Indianapolis Colts
 Jeremiah Trotter (born 1977), linebacker for Philadelphia Eagles
 Justin Tucker (born 1989), placekicker for Baltimore Ravens
 Bulldog Turner (1919–1998), Hall of Fame center and linebacker for Chicago Bears
 Rob Turner (born 1984), former NFL player

U–Z

 Tony Ugoh (born 1983), offensive tackle for Indianapolis Colts
 Gene Upshaw (1945–2008), Hall of Fame guard for Oakland Raiders
 Kenny Vaccaro (born 1991), safety for New Orleans Saints
 Louis Vasquez (born 1987), offensive guard for Denver Broncos
 Dustin Vaughan (born 1991), quarterback for Dallas Cowboys
 Lawrence Vickers (born 1983), fullback for Dallas Cowboys
 Trevin Wade (born 1989), cornerback for New York Giants
 LaAdrian Waddle (born 1991), offensive tackle for New England Patriots
 Doak Walker (1927–1998), College and Hall of Fame player for SMU and Detroit Lions, winner of Heisman Trophy
 Jamar Wall (born 1988), cornerback for Philadelphia Eagles
 J. D. Walton (born 1987), center for New York Giants
 John Washington (born 1963), defensive end for New York Giants
 Brian Waters (born 1977), offensive guard for New England Patriots
 Armani Watts (born 1996), safety for Kansas City Chiefs
 J'Marcus Webb (born 1988), offensive tackle for Chicago Bears
 Sean Weatherspoon (born 1987), linebacker for Arizona Cardinals
 Scott Wells (born 1981), center for St. Louis Rams
 DeAndrew White (born 1991), wide receiver for San Francisco 49ers
 Melvin White (born 1990), cornerback for Carolina Panthers
 Nikita Whitlock (born 1991), fullback for New York Giants
 Fozzy Whittaker (born 1989), running back, kick returner, Carolina Panthers
 Aaron Williams (born 1990), safety for Buffalo Bills 
 Bobbie Williams (born 1976), guard for Baltimore Ravens
 Brandon Williams (born 1986), linebacker for Dallas Cowboys
 Brian Williams (born 1972), NFL linebacker
 Byron Williams (born 1960), NFL and WLAF wide receiver
 Connor Williams (born 1997), offensive guard for the Dallas Cowboys
 Daryl Williams (born 1992), offensive tackle for Carolina Panthers
 D. J. Williams (born 1988), tight end for Green Bay Packers
 Malcolm Williams (born 1987), defensive back for New England Patriots
 Roy Williams (born 1981), wide receiver for Dallas Cowboys
 Teddy Williams (born 1988), cornerback for Carolina Panthers
 Terrance Williams (born 1989), wide receiver for Dallas Cowboys
 Trent Williams (born 1988), offensive tackle for Washington Redskins, San Francisco 49ers
 Josh Wilson (born 1985), cornerback for Atlanta Falcons
 Wade Wilson (1959–2019), quarterback for Minnesota Vikings; quarterbacks coach for Dallas Cowboys
 Eric Winston (born 1983), offensive tackle for Houston Texans
 Will Witherspoon (born 1980), linebacker for Tennessee Titans
 Kendall Wright (born 1989), wide receiver for the Chicago Bears
 Vince Young (born 1983), quarterback for Texas Longhorns and Philadelphia Eagles, MVP of 2005 and 2006 Rose Bowl

Golf

 Rich Beem (born 1970), professional golfer
 Harry Cooper (1904–2000), professional golfer
 Bettye Danoff (1923–2011), golfer, one of founding members of LPGA
 Lee Elder (1934–2021), golfer, first African American to play in the Masters Tournament
 Ben Hogan (1912–1997), golfer
 Betty Jameson (1919–2009), golfer
 Tom Kite (born 1949), golfer
 Byron Nelson (1912–2006), professional golfer
 Corey Pavin (born 1959), professional golfer
 Harvey Penick (1904–1995), golfer, golf coach, elected to World Golf Hall of Fame
 Jordan Spieth (born 1993), golfer, achieved No. 1 world ranking at age 22
 Lee Trevino (born 1939), golfer
 Kathy Whitworth (1939–2022), golfer in World Golf Hall of Fame
 Babe Didrikson Zaharias (1911–1956), athlete, won 82 amateur and professional golf tournaments, including five major professional championships

Motorsports

 Brandon Bernstein (born 1972) drag racer, NHRA top fuel driver, son of Kenny Bernstein
 Kenny Bernstein (born 1944), drag racer, six-time NHRA champion, father of Brandon Bernstein
 Chris Buescher (born 1992), NASCAR driver
 James Buescher (born 1990), former NASCAR driver
 Colin Braun (born 1988), professional race car driver
 Joie Chitwood (1912–1988), professional race car driver
 Brad Coleman (born 1988), former NASCAR driver
 Bayley Currey (born 1996), NASCAR driver
 Trenton Estep (born 1999), race car driver
 A. J. Foyt (born 1935), race car driver
 Jesse Iwuji (born 1987), NASCAR driver
 Bobby Labonte (born 1964), NASCAR driver, 2000 Winston Cup Champion, younger brother of Terry Labonte
 Terry Labonte (born 1956), NASCAR driver, NASCAR Hall of Fame inductee, 1996 Winston Cup Champion
 Carroll Shelby (1923–2012), race car driver and designer of the Shelby Cobra and other automobiles
 David Starr (born 1967), NASCAR driver

Professional wrestling

 Toni Adams (1964–2010), wrestling manager and valet
 Stone Cold Steve Austin (born 1964), WWE wrestler and actor
 Texas Tank Bernard
 Tully Blanchard (born 1954), NWA wrestler, original Four Horsemen member
 Celeste Bonin (born 1986), WWE wrestler known as Kaitlyn
 Mark Calaway (born 1965), WWE wrestler known as The Undertaker
 Dixie Carter (born 1964), President of TNA Wrestling
 Bobby Duncum Jr. (1965–2000), former WCW wrestler
 Dory Funk Sr. (1919–1973), wrestler, trainer, and promoter
 Dory Funk Jr. (born 1941), NWA wrestler and trainer
 Terry Funk (born 1944) NWA and ECW champion, one of the first hardcore wrestlers
 Gorgeous George (George Wagner) (1915–1963), professional wrestler, grew up in Houston
 Nidia Guenard (born 1979), former WWE wrestler and 2001 WWE Tough Enough Co-winner
 Eddie Guerrero (1967–2005), WWE champion
 Chavo Guerrero Sr. (1949–2017), former NWA champion
 Chavo Guerrero Jr. (born 1970), WCW and WWE wrestler
 Vickie Guerrero (born 1968), WWE personality
 Stan Hansen (born 1949), AJPW wrestler
 Mark Henry (born 1971), WWE wrestler
 Shawn Hernandez (born 1973), TNA wrestler
 Lance Hoyt (born 1977), TNA wrestler
 Booker Huffman (born 1965), WCW and WWE wrestler known as Booker T
 Lash Huffman (born 1958), WCW wrestler
 John Layfield (born 1966), former WWE champion JBL/Bradshaw
 Shawn Michaels (born 1965), former WWE wrestler and champion
 Jacqueline Moore (born 1964), former WWE women's champion
 Blackjack Mulligan (1942–2016), former NWA wrestler
 Dick Murdoch (1946–1996), former NWA wrestler
 Bruce Prichard (born 1963), Brother Love in the WWE
 Tom Prichard (born 1959), WWE wrestler
 Scott Putski (born 1966), former WCW and WWE wrestler
 Dustin Rhodes (born 1969), WWE wrestler Goldust
 Dusty Rhodes (1945–2015), WWE wrestler
 Wendi Richter (born 1961), WWE wrestler
 Jake "The Snake" Roberts (born 1955), former WWE wrestler
 Tito Santana (born 1953), former WWE wrestler
 Jesse Sorensen (born 1989), TNA wrestler
 Robert Swenson (1957–1997), former WCW wrestler and actor
 Von Erich Family, wrestling family which competed in various Texas and southern promotions
 Erik Watts (born 1967), former WCW wrestler
 Alicia Webb (born 1979), former WWE star Ryan Shamrock
 Barry Windham (born 1960), former NWA and WCW wrestler
 Kendall Windham (born 1967), former NWA and WCW wrestler

Soccer

Jeff Agoos (born 1968), Swiss-born American soccer defender, Hall of Fame
 Neil Cohen (born 1955), soccer player
 Clint Dempsey (born 1983), soccer player, plays for Fulham FC and United States Men's National Soccer Team
 Nick Garcia (born 1979), soccer player
 Omar Gonzalez (born 1988), soccer player
 Weston McKennie (born 1998), soccer player, plays for Juventus and United States Men's National Soccer Team
 Hassan Nazari (born 1956), soccer player, coach, youth club founder
 Lee Nguyen (born 1986), soccer player

Swimming

 Cammile Adams (born 1991), Olympic swimmer
 Shaine Casas (born 1999), competitive swimmer
 Madisyn Cox (born 1995), competitive swimmer
 Carli Cronk (born 2006), deaf swimmer
 Josh Davis (born 1972), Olympic gold and silver medalist in freestyle swimming
 Jimmy Feigen (born 1989), Olympic swimmer and gold medalist
 Natalie Hinds (born 1993), Olympic swimmer
 Micah Lawrence (born 1990), Olympic swimmer
 Celina Lemmen (born 1985), Olympic swimmer
 Simone Manuel (born 1996), Olympic swimmer and gold medalist
 Katie Meili (born 1991), Olympic swimmer and bronze medalist
 Dana Vollmer (born 1987), swimmer, gold medalist at 2004 Olympics

Tennis

 Zina Garrison (born 1963), tennis player
 Liv Hovde (born 2005), tennis player, won Wimbledon girls' singles title
 Karl Kamrath (1911–1988), tennis player, architect
 Cliff Richey (born 1946), tennis player, achieved world number-six ranking
 Nancy Richey (born 1942), tennis player, won six major championships in singles and doubles, achieved world number-two ranking
 Michael Russell (born 1978), tennis player
 Dick Savitt (born 1927), tennis player ranked number two in the world
 Bill Scanlon (1956–2021), tennis player
 Anne Smith (born 1959), tennis player, ten major championships in doubles, ranked world number one in doubles

Track and field

 Brigetta Barrett (born 1990), high jumper
 Matthew S. Brown (born 1976), track and field champion at 2007 Parapan American Games in Rio de Janeiro
 Cameron Burrell (1994–2021), sprinter
 Dave Clark (1936–2018), Olympic pole vaulter
 Melissa González (born 1994), hurdler
 Carlette Guidry-White (born 1968), sprinter
 Leonard Hilton (1947–2000), distance runner
 Ariana Ince (born 1989), javelin thrower
 Michael Johnson (born 1967), sprinter, Olympic gold medalist, world record holder
 Maggie Malone (born 1993), javelin thrower
 Sha'Carri Richardson (born 2000), sprinter
 Louise Ritter (born 1958), Olympic gold medalist in high jump
 Raevyn Rogers (born 1996), middle-distance runner, Olympic medalist
 Tom Tellez (born 1933), collegiate track and field coach
 Jeremy Wariner (born 1984), track & field Olympic gold medalist
 Mal Whitfield (1924–2015), Olympic gold medalist in the 800-meter run
 Darold Williamson (born 1983), Olympic gold medalist in track & field
 Babe Didrikson Zaharias (1914–1956), track & field gold medalist 1932 Olympics, golfer in World Golf Hall of Fame

Mind sports

 Amarillo Slim (Thomas Preston Jr.) (1928–2012), poker champion
 Doyle Brunson (born 1933), professional poker player
 Johnny Chan (born 1957), professional poker player
 Bobby Goldman (1938–1999), bridge player
 Bob Hamman (born 1938), bridge player
 James Jacoby (1933–1991), bridge player
 Oswald Jacoby (1902–1984), bridge player
 Ruifeng Li (born 2001), chess grandmaster
 Johnny Moss (1907–1995), professional poker player
 Robert Salaburu (born 1985), poker player
 David Williams (born 1980), poker player
 Trey Wright (born 1974), U.S. national Scrabble champion, classical concert pianist

Other

 Terence Anderson (born c. 1946), sport shooter
 Lance Armstrong (born 1971), cyclist, disqualified champion of Tour de France
 Del Ballard Jr. (born 1963), professional bowler
 Richard Bass (1929–2015), mountaineer, first person to climb the "Seven Summits"; business owner
 Kyle Bennett (1979–2012), bicycle motocross racer
 Evan Bernstein (born 1960), Israeli Olympic wrestler
 Simone Biles (born 1997), world- and Olympic-champion gymnast
 Aimee Boorman (born 1973), gymnastics coach
 Aimee Buchanan (born 1993), American-born Olympic figure skater for Israel
 Tervel Dlagnev (born 1985), Olympic Greco-Roman wrestler, bronze medalist at 2012 Summer Olympics
 Cowboy Morgan Evans (1903–1969), rodeo, steer wrestling champion 1928
 Jennifer Gutierrez (born 1967), triathlete
 Heath Herring (born 1978), mixed martial artist
 Seth Jones (born 1994), ice hockey player for the Columbus Blue Jackets
 Madison Kocian (born 1997), world- and Olympic-champion gymnast
 Courtney Kupets (born 1986), world and U.S. champion gymnast, silver medalist in 2004 Summer Olympics
 Rafael A. Lecuona (1928–2014), Cuban-American gymnast, 1948–1956
 Brian Leetch (born 1968), Hall of Fame hockey defenseman, primarily with the New York Rangers
 Tara Lipinski (born 1982), figure skater, Olympic gold medalist
 Nastia Liukin (born 1989), 2008 Olympic gymnastics all-around gold medalist
 Patricia McCormick (1929–2013), bullfighter
 Bubba McDaniel (born 1983), mixed martial artist
 Tamyra Mensah-Stock (born 1992), sport wrestler; world champion, Olympic gold medalist
 Delaney Miller (born 1995), rock climber
 Robert Mosbacher (1927–2010), yacht racer, businessman, politician 
 Cat Osterman (born 1983), softball pitcher
 Carly Patterson (born 1988), 2004 Olympic gymnastics all-around gold medalist
 Bill Pickett (1870–1932), cowboy and rodeo performer
 Todd Pletcher (born 1967), horse trainer
 Alex Puccio (born 1989), climber
 Tex Rickard (1870–1929), sports promoter
 Keith Sanderson (born 1975), sport shooter
 Ruth Taubert Seeger (1924–2014), athlete and coach, competed in 1957 Summer Deaflympics, member of Texas Women's Hall of Fame 
 Willie Shoemaker (1931–2003), jockey
 Brandon Slay (born 1975), Olympic freestyle wrestler, gold medalist at 2000 Olympics
 Hollie Vise (born 1987), world-champion gymnast
 Walel Watson (born 1984), mixed martial artist
 Kaitlyn Weaver (born 1989), ice dancer, competes for Canada
 Chip Woolley (born 1963), racehorse trainer

Business
A–E

 Red Adair (1915–2004), offshore oil field firefighter
 Joe Allbritton (1924–2012), banker, publisher, philanthropist
 Monroe Dunaway Anderson (1873–1939), banker, cotton trader, business executive, philanthropist
 John S. Armstrong (1850–1908), Dallas-area real estate developer, founded Oak Cliff, Highland Park, the State Fair of Texas
 Mary Kay Ash (1918–2001), businesswoman and founder of Mary Kay Cosmetics
 George Ballas (1925–2011), entrepreneur, invented Weed Eater
 Ed Bass (born 1945), businessman, financier, philanthropist, environmentalist
 Harry W. Bass Jr. (1927–1998), oil business, philanthropist
 Harry W. Bass Sr. (1895–1970), oil business
 Richard Bass (1929–2015), owner of Snowbird Ski Resort; pioneering mountaineer
 Robert Bass (born 1948), billionaire philanthropist, chairman of Oak Hill Capital, conservationist
 Sid Bass (born 1942), billionaire investor and oil magnate from Fort Worth
 Andrew Beal (born 1952), banker, businessman, investor, poker player, mathematician; billionaire
 Benny Binion (1904–1989), Las Vegas casino owner; previously an organized-crime boss
 Jack Binion (born 1937), businessman
 Jack S. Blanton (1927–2013), oil industry executive, civic leader, philanthropist
 Ghulam Bombaywala (born 1973), restaurateur
 Kimberly S. Bowers (born 1965), business executive
 George Washington Brackenridge (1832–1920), banker, business executive, philanthropist, social activist, university regent
 Nancy Brinker (born 1946), business executive, ambassador
 Norman Brinker (1931–2009), restaurateur
 George R. Brown (1898–1983), construction company founder, entrepreneur, philanthropist
 Samuel Burk Burnett (1849–1922), cattleman, rancher
 Charles Butt (born 1938), CEO of H-E-B supermarket chain, billionaire
 Howard Edward Butt Sr. (1895–1991), businessman, philanthropist; founded H-E-B grocery store chain
 David Harold Byrd (1900–1986), oilman, founder of Civil Air Patrol
 Frank Kell Cahoon (1934–2013), oilman, natural gas entrepreneur, state representative
 Joseph Campisi (1918–1990), restaurateur
 Don Carter (1933–2018), investor, businessman; owned professional sports teams
 Josef Centeno, chef, restaurateur
 Eddie Chiles (1910–1993), oil business founder and executive; major-league baseball team owner
 George W. Church Sr. (1887–1956), founder of Church's Chicken
 Sarah Horton Cockrell (1819–1892), businesswoman, millionaire
 Carr Collins Sr. (1892–1980), insurance magnate, philanthropist
 Brad Corbett (1937–2012), oil business, owned the Texas Rangers baseball team
 Helen Corbitt (1906–1978), chef, cookbook author
 Carl G. Cromwell (1889–1931), oil driller and aviation pioneer
 Harlan Crow (born 1949), real estate developer
 Trammell Crow (1914–2009), commercial real estate developer
 Mary C. Crowley (1915–1986), business executive
 Sherwood Cryer (1927–2009), entrepreneur, co-owned and operated Gilley's honky-tonk nightclub
 Mark Cuban (born 1958), billionaire entrepreneur, owner of Dallas Mavericks basketball team
 Joseph S. Cullinan (1860–1937), oil industrialist, founder of Texaco
 Robert B. Cullum (1912–1981), founder of Tom Thumb supermarket chain
 Ray Davis, business executive, baseball team owner
 Robert Decherd (born 1951), businessman; chairman, President, and CEO of A. H. Belo
 Michael Dell (born 1965), founder of Dell Inc.
 Clara Driscoll (1881–1945), businesswoman, philanthropist, historic preservationist
 Angelo Drossos (1928–1997), stockbroker, owner of San Antonio Spurs
 Charles Duncan Jr. (1926–2022), president of The Coca-Cola Company
 Thomas Dundon (born 1972), financial businessman

F–J

 William Stamps Farish II (1881–1942), president of Standard Oil, founder and president of American Petroleum Institute
 Dean Fearing (born 1955), chef, restaurateur
 Tilman J. Fertitta (born 1957), CEO of Landry's Restaurants, billionaire
 Carly Fiorina (born 1954), CEO of Hewlett-Packard, senior vice president at AT&T, and Ted Cruz's running mate in the 2016 election
 Don Flynn (1934–2010), oil and gas industry executive, professional football player
 Buddy Fogelson (1900–1987), oilman, lawyer, horse breeder, philanthropist; husband of Greer Garson
 Robert Folsom (1927–2017), real estate investor and developer; mayor of Dallas
 Walter Fondren Sr. (1877–1939), oilman, co-founder of Humble Oil (which would become ExxonMobil), philanthropist
 Gerald J. Ford (born 1944), business executive, banker, billionaire, philanthropist
 Joe B. Foster (1934–2020), oil business, philanthropist
 Andrew Friedman (born 1976), banker, Major League Baseball executive
 William Delbert Gann (1878–1955), finance trader, analyst
 William H. Gaston (1840–1927), co-founder, with Aaron C. Camp, of the first banking house in Dallas
 Jim Goode (1944–2016), restaurateur
 Charles Goodnight (1836–1929), legendary Texas cattleman
 Bette Nesmith Graham (1924–1980), inventor, founder of Liquid Paper Corporation, mother of The Monkees' Mike Nesmith
 Eunice Gray (1880–1962), hotel and brothel owner
 Bennett Greenspan (born 1952), entrepreneur, founder of Family Tree DNA
 Carl Hilmar Guenther (1826–1902), miller
 Patrick E. Haggerty (1914–1980), co-founder, president, and chairman of Texas Instruments
 Najeeb Halaby (1915–2003), FAA administrator, chairman and CEO of Pan Am, father of Queen Noor of Jordan
 Ebby Halliday (1911–2015), Realtor, entrepreneur
 Thomas Britton Harris IV (born 1958), investment officer
 Jim Hasslocher (1922–2015), restaurateur
 William R. Hawn (1910–1995), businessman, philanthropist, racehorse breeder
 Pattillo Higgins (1863–1955), oil pioneer and businessman, known as the "Prophet of Spindletop"
 Barron Hilton (1927–2019), billionaire socialite, businessman, heir to Hilton Hotels fortune
 Conrad Hilton (1887–1979), hotel-chain founder
 Conrad Hilton Jr. (1926–1969), socialite, businessman, heir to Hilton Hotels fortune
 Eric Hilton (1933–2016), hotelier, philanthropist
 Gerald D. Hines (1925–2020), real-estate developer
 Timothy Dwight Hobart (1855–1935), landowner, surveyor, rancher, mayor of Pampa
 Peter Holt (born 1948), businessman, headed group that owns San Antonio sports teams
 Roger Horchow (1928–2020), catalog entrepreneur, Broadway producer 
 Thomas William House Sr. (1814–1880), early Houston cotton shipper, founder of Houston's first private bank and first public utility
 Howard Hughes (1905–1976), aviator, filmmaker, eccentric billionaire
 Howard R. Hughes Sr. (1869–1924), entrepreneur, oilman; father of Howard Hughes
 Earl H. Hulsey (1880–1961), businessman, movie-theatre operator
 Caroline Rose Hunt (1923–2018), hotelier, author, philanthropist, heiress
 Clark Hunt (born 1965), chairman and CEO of the Kansas City Chiefs
 H. L. Hunt (1889–1974), oil tycoon, patriarch of Dallas family of legendary wealth and power
 Lamar Hunt (1932–2006), founder of American Football League, Major League Soccer, North American Soccer League
 Nelson Bunker Hunt (1926–2014), oilman, investor, horse breeder
 Ray Lee Hunt (born 1943), oilman
 Columbus Marion "Dad" Joiner (1860–1947), oilman
 Jerry Jones (born 1942), billionaire entrepreneur, oilman, owner of Dallas Cowboys football team
 Jerry Jones Jr. (born 1969), Dallas Cowboys executive
 Stephen Jones (born 1964), Dallas Cowboys executive
 J. Erik Jonsson (1901–1995), co-founder and president of Texas Instruments, mayor of Dallas

K–M

 Herb Kelleher (1931–2019), founder and CEO of Southwest Airlines
 Gary C. Kelly (born 1955), CEO, Southwest Airlines
 Isaac Herbert Kempner (1873–1967), founder of Imperial Sugar, mayor of Galveston
 Kay Kimbell (1886–1964), entrepreneur, philanthropist; endowed Kimbell Art Museum
 Richard King (1824–1885), entrepreneur, founder of the legendary King Ranch
 Rollin King (1931–2014), businessman, investment consultant, co-founder of Southwest Airlines
 John Henry Kirby (1860–1940), businessman, founder of the Kirby Petroleum Company
 Robert J. Kleberg Jr. (1853–1932), managed the King Ranch
 Fred C. Koch (1900–1967), chemical engineer and entrepreneur who founded the oil refinery firm that later became Koch Industries
 Harry Koch (1867–1942), railroad founder, newspaper founder
 Tracy Krohn (born 1954), entrepreneur, auto racing enthusiast
 Eugene Lacritz (1929–2012), retail executive, classical musician
 Ninfa Laurenzo (1924–2001), restaurateur
 Rodney Lewis (born 1954), oil and natural gas industrialist and rancher; second wealthiest individual in San Antonio
 John Lilly, venture capitalist
 David Litman (born 1957), founder of hotels.com and getaroom.com
 James Ling (1922–2004), founder of business conglomerate Ling-Temco-Vought
 Tim Love (born 1971), chef, restaurateur
 Sam Lucchese (1868–1929), businessman, bootmaker, theater impresario
 Gerald Lyda (1923–2005), construction CEO, owner of La Escalera Ranch in Sierra County, New Mexico
 James E. Lyon (1927–1993), real estate developer, banker, and Republican politician in Houston
 John Mackey (born 1953), CEO, Whole Foods Market
 Herbert Marcus (1878–1950), co-founder and CEO of Neiman Marcus
 Minnie Lichtenstein Marcus (1882–1979), vice president of Neiman Marcus, horticulturist
 Stanley Marcus (1905–2002), president and CEO of Neiman Marcus
 Thomas Marsalis (1852–1919), Dallas-area developer
 Mariano Martinez (born 1944), inventor, entrepreneur, restaurateur, invented frozen margarita machine
 Irving Allen Mathews (1917–1994), retail executive, Federal Reserve Bank board chairman
 Lowry Mays (1935–2022), businessman, co-founded Clear Channel Communications
 Glenn McCarthy (1907–1988), oil tycoon, entrepreneur; inspired the character Jett Rink in Giant
 Red McCombs (1927–2023), businessman, owned several professional sports franchises
 Eugene McDermott (1899–1973), founder of Texas Instruments, geophysicist, philanthropist
 William Johnson McDonald (1844–1926), banker, philanthropist
 Jim McIngvale (born 1951), businessman, owns furniture-store chain
 Algur H. Meadows (1899–1978), oilman, philanthropist
 John W. Mecom Sr. (1911–1981), oilman
 George P. Mitchell (1919–2013), billionaire oilman, real estate developer, philanthropist
 Mohamed Elhassan Mohamed (born 1961), entrepreneur; political, religious, cultural activist; father of Ahmed Mohamed
 John T. Montford (born 1943), businessman in San Antonio, former chancellor of the Texas Tech University System, former state senator and district attorney from Lubbock
 Shearn Moody Jr. (1933–1996), financier, entrepreneur, philanthropist 
 William Lewis Moody Jr. (1865–1954), financier, entrepreneur
 John Moores (born 1944), entrepreneur, philanthropist; owner of professional sports teams
 Shea Morenz (born 1974), business executive, former athlete
 Robert Mosbacher (1927–2010), businessman, yacht racer, politician 
 Barry Munitz (born 1941), corporation and foundation executive, university administrator
 Clint Murchison Jr. (1923–1987), oil businessman; founder/owner of Dallas Cowboys football team
 Clint Murchison Sr. (1895–1969), oil magnate

N–R

 Raymond Nasher (1921–2007), real estate developer (NorthPark Center), art collector
 Abraham Lincoln Neiman (1875–1970), co-founder of Neiman Marcus
 Carrie Marcus Neiman (1883–1953), co-founder and CEO of Neiman Marcus
 Bill Noël (1914–1987), oil industrialist and philanthropist from Odessa
 Mary Moody Northen (1892–1986), financier, philanthropist
 Jim Novy (1896–1971), businessman, entrepreneur, philanthropist, supported career of Lyndon B. Johnson; nicknamed "First Jew of Texas"
 Peter O'Donnell (1924–2021), investor, philanthropist, Republican state party chairman, 1962–1969; leader of the Draft Goldwater Committee in 1963–1964
 R.J. O'Donnell (1891–1959), businessman, theatre-chain manager, philanthropist
 William O'Neil (born 1933), entrepreneur, stockbroker, writer, founded Investor's Business Daily
 Marc Ostrofsky (born 1961), venture capitalist, entrepreneur, investor, author
 Ross Perot (1930–2019), entrepreneur; founder of EDS and Perot Systems; 1992 U.S. presidential candidate
 Bob J. Perry (1932–2013), homebuilder, political supporter
 Stephen Samuel Perry (1825–1874), manager of Peach Point Plantation, preserved historical manuscripts
 T. Boone Pickens (1928–2019), energy entrepreneur, philanthropist
 Lonnie "Bo" Pilgrim (1928–2017), founder, chairman, and principal owner of Pilgrim's Pride
 Bernard Rapoport (1917–2012), entrepreneur, philanthropist, author, business executive
 Kent Rathbun (born 1961), chef, restaurateur
 William Marsh Rice (1816–1900), merchant, investor, multimillionaire, philanthropist; namesake of Rice University
 Sid W. Richardson (1891–1959), oilman, cattleman, philanthropist
 Rich Riley (born 1973), Senior Vice President and managing director of Yahoo! EMEA
 Corbin Robertson (born 1947), business executive
 Phil Romano (born 1939), restaurateur
 Willy O. Rossel (1921–2015), chef
 Marvin Travis Runyon (1924–2004), business executive, U.S. Postmaster General
 Reid Ryan (born 1971), Major League Baseball executive, former player

S–T

 Fayez Sarofim (1929–2022), stock-fund manager, part owner of Houston Texans, philanthropist, billionaire
 Tom Scaperlanda (1895–1971), jeweler, circus historian and collector of circusana
 Julius Schepps (1895–1971), business owner, civic leader and philanthropist
 Arthur A. Seeligson Jr. (1920–2001), oilman, rancher, Thoroughbred racehorse owner/breeder
 Daniel R. Scoggin (born 1937), founder of TGI Friday's, Inc., restaurateur
 Frank Sharp (1906–1993), land developer
 Walter Benona Sharp (1870–1912), oilman, innovator, philanthropist
 Anna Shelton (1861–1939), real-estate developer, founder of women's clubs
 Ascher Silberstein (1852–1909), cattleman, banker, oilman, philanthropist
 Harold Simmons (1931–2013), billionaire businessman, banker, philanthropist; developed concept of leveraged buyout
 Bob R. Simpson, business executive, baseball team owner
 Henry Singleton (1916–1999), electrical engineer, co-founder of Teledyne Technologies
 Bill Sinkin (1913–2014), banker, community activist
 Tom Slick (1916–1962), inventor, businessman, adventurer, entrepreneur, philanthropist
 Merrie Spaeth (born 1948), business public relations consultant, political consultant, educator, former actress
 John Sparks (1843–1908), cattle rancher, Texas Ranger, became governor of Nevada
 A. Latham Staples (born 1977), CEO of EXUSMED, Inc., civil rights activist, and founder/Chairman of Empowering Spirits Foundation
 Felix Stehling (1927–2012), businessman, restaurateur, founded Taco Cabana
 John M. Stemmons (1909–2001), real estate developer, civic leader
 Leslie Stemmons (1876–1939), businessman
 Frank Sterling (1869–1938), oil business
 Ross S. Sterling (1875–1949), founder of Humble Oil (which would become ExxonMobil), Governor of Texas
 James Stillman (1850–1918), banker, investor, corporate executive
 David Tallichet (1922–2007), developed the theme restaurant concept
 Anne Valliant Burnett Tandy (1900–1980), rancher, horsebreeder, philanthropist, art collector
 Charles D. Tandy (1918–1978), chairman, president, and CEO of Tandy Corporation
 Ben Taub (1889–1982), businessman, philanthropist
 Rich Templeton (born 1958), president, chairman, and CEO of Texas Instruments
 Robert L. Thornton (1880–1964), founder and president of Mercantile Bank in Dallas, mayor and civic leader of Dallas
 Tex Thornton (1913–1981), founder of Litton Industries
 Felix Tijerina (1905–1965), restaurateur
 Rex Tillerson (born 1952), chairman, president and CEO of ExxonMobil
 Kenny Troutt (born 1948), telecommunications company founder, racehorse owner, billionaire

U–Z

 Daniel Waggoner (1828–1902), rancher, businessman, banker
 E. Paul Waggoner (1889–1967), rancher, horsebreeder
 Guy Waggoner (1883–1950), rancher, business executive
 William Thomas Waggoner (1852–1934), rancher, oilman, banker, horsebreeder, philanthropist
 Kelcy Warren (born 1955), chairman and CEO of Energy Transfer Partners
 Sherron Watkins (born 1959), Vice President at the Enron Corporation, whistleblower who helped uncover the Enron scandal
 George Washington West (1851–1926), rancher
 James Marion West Jr. (1903–1957), oilman
 James Marion West Sr. (1871–1941), business tycoon
 Edward Whitacre Jr. (born 1941), chairman of the board and CEO of General Motors, chairman of the board and CEO of AT&T Inc.
 Clayton Wheat Williams Jr. (1931–2020), oilman; Republican gubernatorial nominee, 1990
 Gus Sessions Wortham (1891–1976), businessman, philanthropist
 Charles Wyly (1933–2011), entrepreneur, businessman, philanthropist, civic leader
 Sam Wyly (born 1934), entrepreneur, businessman, philanthropist
 Angus G. Wynne (1914–1979), founder of Six Flags Over Texas and subsequent corporate theme parks
 Benjamin Franklin Yoakum (1859–1929), railroad executive
 H.B. Zachry (1901–1984), construction business executive
 Zig Ziglar (1926–2012), salesman, motivational speaker, author
 Andrew Jackson Zilker (1858–1934), businessman, civic leader, philanthropist in Austin

Law and jurisprudence

 James A. Baker Jr. (1892–1973), attorney
 Captain James A. Baker (1857–1941), attorney for William Marsh Rice, banker
 Judge James A. Baker (1821–1897), jurist, politician
 Roy Bean (c. 1825 – 1903), Justice of the Peace, called himself "The Law West of the Pecos"
 Jean Hudson Boyd (born 1954), district court judge who sentenced Ethan Couch to probation based on "affluenza" defense
 John W. Brady (1869?–1943), lawyer
 Will P. Brady (1876–1943), district attorney
 Ruth Virginia Brazzil (1889–1976), lawyer
 Tony Buzbee (born 1968), trial lawyer
 Norma V. Cantu (born 1954), civil rights lawyer, educator
 Ronald H. Clark (born 1953), judge of the United States District Court for the Eastern District of Texas, based in Beaumont; former member of the Texas House of Representatives from Sherman
 Tom C. Clark (1899–1977), United States Attorney General and Associate Justice of the Supreme Court of the United States
 Linda Coffee (born 1942), attorney for Norma McCorvey in Roe v. Wade
 Elma Salinas Ender (born 1953), first Hispanic female to serve on a state district court in Texas; judge of the 341st Judicial District, based in Laredo, 1983–2012
 Percy Foreman (1902–1988), criminal defense attorney
 Hans Peter Mareus Neilsen Gammel (1854–1931), editor and publisher of The Laws of Texas 1822–1897
 Mike Godwin (born 1956), attorney, author
 Alberto Gonzales (born 1955), United States Attorney General
 Richard "Racehorse" Haynes (1927–2017), defense attorney, author
 Randy Hendricks (born 1945), sports lawyer, author
 Hattie Leah Henenberg (1893–1974), lawyer
 Harry Hertzberg (1883–1940), attorney, Texas state senator, civic leader
 Barbara Hines, immigration rights attorney
 Joe Jamail (1925–2015), attorney, billionaire
 Leon Jaworski (1905–1982), attorney, was special prosecutor during the Watergate scandal hearings
 Jim Mattox (1943–2008), U.S. representative and attorney general of Texas
 Harry McPherson (1929–2012), special counsel to President Lyndon Johnson, lawyer, lobbyist
 Harriet Miers (born 1945), attorney, White House Counsel, nominated for U.S. Supreme Court
 Sandra Day O'Connor (born 1930), former associate justice of the United States Supreme Court; first woman on the high court
 John O'Quinn (1941–2009), attorney
 Jack Pope (1913–2017), Chief Justice of Texas Supreme Court
 Louise Raggio (1919–2011), attorney, first female prosecutor in Texas
 Nellie Gray Robertson (1894–1955), lawyer
 David McAdams Sibley (born 1948), attorney-lobbyist, former Texas state senator (1991–2002) and mayor of Waco (1987–1988)
 Ken Starr (born 1946), attorney, federal judge, Solicitor General, and Independent Counsel during the Clinton Administration
 Stephen Susman (1941–2020), plaintiffs attorney and a founding partner of Susman Godfrey
 Carol Vance (born 1933), district attorney, head of Texas Board of Criminal Justice
 Dale Wainwright (born 1961), Justice, Texas Supreme Court
 Hortense Sparks Ward (1872–1944), lawyer, women's rights activist
 Craig Watkins (born 1967), first African-American district attorney in Texas, Dallas Morning News Texan of the Year 2008
 Edith Wilmans (1882–1966), lawyer, state legislator
 Will Wilson (1912–2005), Attorney General of Texas, Texas Supreme Court justice
 Jared Woodfill (born 1968), attorney, political activist
 Mark Yudof (born 1944), law professor, university chancellor
 Kathleen Zellner, attorney

Law enforcement

 David Brown (born 1960), chief of Dallas Police Department
 James B. Gillett (1856–1937), lawman, member of Texas Ranger Hall of Fame
 T. J. Goree (1835–1905), superintendent of penitentiaries in Texas, namesake of the Goree Unit of the Texas Department of Criminal Justice; Confederate Army captain, attorney
 Frank Hamer (1884–1955), Texas Ranger, led raid in which Bonnie and Clyde were killed
 Roy Hazelwood (1938–2016), FBI profiler
 Ted Hinton (1904–1977), deputy sheriff involved in raid in which Bonnie and Clyde were killed
 Joaquin Jackson (1935–2016), Texas Ranger, author, actor
 John B. Jones (1834–1881), captain of Texas Rangers Frontier Battalion
 Jim Leavelle (1920–2019), Dallas Police detective who was escorting Lee Harvey Oswald when Oswald was shot
 Darrell Lunsford (1943–1991), was murdered while arresting drug suspects
 Ramiro Martinez (born 1937), police officer involved in killing of sniper Charles Whitman
 David Atlee Phillips (1922–1988), officer for the CIA, recipient of the Career Intelligence Medal
 Phil Ryan (born 1945), Texas Ranger who arrested serial killer Henry Lee Lucas
 Charlie Siringo (1855–1928), Wild West lawman
 Ben Thompson (1843–1884), Old West lawman, gunman, gambler
 J. D. Tippit (1924–1963), Dallas police officer who questioned Lee Harvey Oswald following the assassination of John F. Kennedy and was subsequently killed by Oswald
 Charles Winstead (1891–1973), FBI Agent in the 1930s–1940s; one of the agents who shot and killed John Dillinger

Art, photography, architecture
A–K

 Walter W. Ahlschlager (1887–1965), architect
 Larry D. Alexander (born 1953), visual artist
 Natalia Anciso (born 1985), visual artist
 José Arpa (1858–1952), painter
 Tex Avery (1908–1980), animator, cartoonist, director
 Atlee Ayres (1873–1969), architect
 Robert M. Ayres (1898–1977), architect
 Bill Barminski (born 1962), artist, designer, filmmaker
 Donald Barthelme (1907–1996), architect
 Arthello Beck (1941–2004), visual artist
 Bobby Berk (born 1981), interior designer, television personality
 John T. Biggers (1924–2001), muralist, established art department at Texas Southern University
 Electra Waggoner Biggs (1912–2001), sculptor
 Rora Blue, visual artist
 Melinda Bordelon (1949–1995), painter, illustrator
 Berkeley Breathed (born 1957), Pulitzer Prize-winning cartoonist, author/illustrator, director, screenwriter
 Susan Budge (born 1959), ceramic sculptor
 Harold Dow Bugbee (1900–1963), artist
 John Cassaday (born 1971), comic book artist
 Keith Carter (born 1948), photographer, educator, artist
 John S. Chase (1925–2012), architect
 Mel Chin (born 1951), conceptual visual artist
 Harold F. Clayton (1954–2015), sculptor
 Nicholas Joseph Clayton (1840–1916), architect
 Matchett Herring Coe (1907–1999), sculptor
 Pompeo Coppini (1870–1957), sculptor, teacher
 George Dahl (1894–1987), architect
 Gabriel Dawe (born 1973), artist
 Dawson Dawson-Watson (1864–1939), impressionist painter
 Charles August Albert Dellschau (1830–1923), outsider artist
 Neil Denari (born 1957), architect
 Richard Dominguez (born 1960), comic book artist
 Brian Adam Douglas (born 1972), visual artist
 Dan Dunn (born 1957), speed painter, cartoonist, caricaturist
 Emily Edwards (1888–1980), artist, historian, conservationist, teacher, civic leader
 Charles Fincher (born 1945), cartoonist, lawyer
 Joseph Finger (1887–1953), architect
 Alfred C. Finn (1883–1964), architect
 O'Neil Ford (1905–1982), architect
 Jim Franklin (born 1943), artist, illustrator, underground cartoonist
 Lois Gibson (born c. 1950), forensic artist
 Alfred Giles (1853–1920), architect
 Francois P. Giraud (1818–1877), architect, surveyor, mayor of San Antonio
 Rolando Gomez (born 1962), photographer
 Xavier Gonzalez (1898–1993), muralist, sculptor, teacher
 Glenna Goodacre (1939–2020), sculptor, designed obverse of Sacagawea dollar
 James Riely Gordon (1863–1937), architect
 Herbert M. Greene (1871–1932), architect
 Priscilla Hamby (born 1982), illustrator, comic-book artist
 Trenton Doyle Hancock (born 1974), visual artist
 Wyatt C. Hedrick (1888–1964), architect
 Wolf Hilbertz (1938–2007), architect, inventor, marine scientist, educator
 Barbara Hines (born 1950), artist
 Armando Hinojosa (born 1944), sculptor
 Alexandre Hogue (1898–1994), realist painter
 Dorothy Hood (1919–2000), Modernist painter
 Carl Hoppe (1897–1981), painter
 Louis Hoppe (fl. 1860s), 19th-century folk artist
 Lance Hosey (1964–2021), architect
 Robert H.H. Hugman (1902–1980), architect, designed San Antonio River Walk
 Walter Iooss (born 1943), photographer
 Natalie Irish (born 1982), multimedia artist, pioneer of the lip print technique
 James Ivey (born 1967), artist, painter, carnival surrealism
 Elisa Jimenez (born 1963), interdisciplinary artist, fashion designer
 Luis Jiménez (1940–2006), sculptor
 Raoul Josset (1899–1957), sculptor
 Donald Judd (1928–1994), sculptor
 Karl Kamrath (1911–1988), architect, tennis player
 Cheryl Kelley (born 1968), photorealist painter
 George Kessler (1862–1923), landscape architect, city planner
 John F. Knott (1878–1963), political cartoonist, illustrator, art educator

L–Z

 Thomas C. Lea, III (1907–2001), muralist, illustrator, artist, war correspondent, novelist, historian
 Harold LeDoux (1926–2015), cartoonist, Judge Parker
 Rick Lowe (born 1961), visual artist, social activist, educator, MacArthur Fellow
 Hermann Lungkwitz (1813–1891), landscape artist, photographer
 Bob Mader (1943–2005), photographer
 Stanley Marsh 3 (1938–2014), millionaire artist and philanthropist
 Florence McClung (1894–1992), painter, printmaker, art teacher
 Marion Koogler McNay (1883–1950), artist, teacher, art collector, museum founder, philanthropist
 Alex McVey (born 1978), illustrator
 Michael Mehaffy (born 1955), architectural theorist
 Jesús Moroles (1950–2015), sculptor
 Elisabet Ney (1833–1907), sculptor
 Diane O'Leary (1939–2013), multimedia artist
 Lovie Olivia, multidisciplinary visual artist
 Julian Onderdonk (1882–1922), painter
 Robert Jenkins Onderdonk (1852–1917), painter
 Graydon Parrish (born 1970), realist painter
 Harry D. Payne (1891–1987), architect
 John Picacio (born 1969), science fiction-fantasy artist, illustrator
 Dan Piraro (born 1958), painter, illustrator, cartoonist
 Thomas M. Price (1916–1998), architect
 Don Ivan Punchatz (1936–2009), science fiction-fantasy artist, illustrator
 Gregor Punchatz (born 1967), artist/sculptor for video games
 Robert Rauschenberg (1925–2008), painter, sculptor, graphic artist
 Frank Reaugh (1860–1945), painter
 Everette Dixie Reese (1923–1955), photographer, photojournalist
 Ace Reid (1925–1991), cartoonist and humorist
 Lucy Wilson Rice (1874–1963), painter
 Joe Riley (1964–2007), visual and plastic artist
 Dario Robleto (born 1972), conceptual artist
 Elizabeth Barlow Rogers (born 1936), landscape designer, landscape preservationist, writer
 Jermaine Rogers (born 1972), poster artist
 Nancy Rubins (born 1952), sculptor, installation artist
 Verónica Ruiz de Velasco (born 1968), painter
 Robh Ruppel (born c. 1963), illustrator
 Porfirio Salinas (1910–1973), landscape painter
 Julian Schnabel (born 1951), artist, film director
 Emil Schuhmann (1856–1937), folk artist, accordionist, bandleader
 Zachary Selig (1949–2016), artist, painter, writer
 Mark Seliger (born 1959), photographer
 Gilbert Shelton (born 1940), cartoonist
 Erwin E. Smith (1886–1947), photographer
 Justin Storms (born 1981), artist, musician, and creator of coloring book The Whaletopian Coloring Book
 James Surls (born 1943), modernist sculptor
 Johnnie Swearingen (1908–1993), artist
 Masaru Takiguchi (born 1941), sculptor, arts educator
 Waldine Tauch (1892–1986), sculptor
 Karen T. Taylor (born 1952), forensic and portrait artist
 Frank Teich (1856–1939), sculptor
 Wilhelm Thielepape (1814–1904), architect, lithographer, photographer, surveyor, attorney, mayor of San Antonio
 Jesse Treviño (1946–2023), visual artist
 Charles Umlauf (1911–1994), sculptor, art educator
 Vincent Valdez (born 1977), artist
 Bob Wade (1943–2019), artist, sculptor in "Cosmic Cowboy" genre
 William Ward Watkin (1886–1952), architect, founder of Rice University Department of Architecture
 Mack White (born 1952), comic book artist
 Verner Moore White (1863–1923), landscape and portrait artist
 Robert Whiteside (1950–2006), jewelry and craft maker and designer, polymath
 George Rodney Willis (1879–1960), architect
 Laura Wilson (born 1939), photographer
 Robert William Wood (1889–1979), landscape painter

Literature
A–G

 Jeff Abbott (born 1963), mystery novelist
 Susan Wittig Albert (born 1940), mystery writer
 Mildred Vorpahl Baass (1917–2012), poet
 Karle Wilson Baker (1878–1960), poet, author
 Wendy Barker (born 1942), poet, educator
 Neal Barrett Jr. (1929–2014), science fiction-fantasy writer
 Barbara Barrie (born 1931), author of children's books
 Rick Bass (born 1958), writer, environmentalist
 Roy Bedichek (1878–1959), writer, naturalist, educator
 Raymond Benson (born 1955), novelist
 Sarah Bird (born 1949), novelist, screenwriter, journalist
 Cheryl Bolen (born 1946), novelist, journalist
 J. Mason Brewer (1896–1975), folklorist, scholar, writer
 Sandra Brown (born 1948), novelist
 James Lee Burke (born 1936), mystery writer
 Hector Cantú (born 1961), writer, editor, newspaper comic strip creator
 Aline B. Carter (1892–1972), poet
 Oscar Casares (born 1964), writer, educator
 Kathryn Casey, mystery and true crime author
 Cyrus Cassells (born 1957), poet
 Rosemary Catacalos (born 1944), poet
 Katherine Center (born 1972), author of chick lit, mommy lit
 Pat Choate (born 1941), author, economist
 Susan Choi (born 1969), novelist
 Sandra Cisneros (born 1954), author and poet
 Tamarie Cooper (born 1970), playwright, actress
 Bill Crider (1941–2018), mystery writer
 Deborah Crombie (born 1952), mystery writer
 Justin Cronin (born 1962), novelist
 Grace Noll Crowell (1877–1969), poet
 James Crumley (1939–2008), crime novelist
 Jan de Hartog (1914–2002), Nobel Prize-nominated author, Tony Award-winning playwright, social activist, philanthropist
 Jim Dent (born 1953), author, sportswriter
 Adina Emilia De Zavala (1861–1955), writer, historian, educator
 J. Frank Dobie (1888–1964), folklorist and writer about open-range days
 Carole Nelson Douglas (1944–2021), mystery writer
 Marianne J. Dyson (born 1955), writer on space science
 Robert M. Edsel (born 1956), nonfiction writer, oil company founder and innovator
 Kurt Eichenwald (born 1961), author, journalist
 John R. Erickson (born 1943), cowboy, author, songwriter, voice actor, wrote Hank the Cowdog series
 Jill Alexander Essbaum (born 1971), poet, writer, professor
 B. H. Fairchild (born 1942), poet
 Kitty Ferguson (born 1941), science writer
 Robert Flynn (born 1932), novelist
 Horton Foote (1916–2009), author and playwright
 Carrie Fountain, poet
 Hans Peter Mareus Neilsen Gammel (1854–1931), editor and publisher of The Laws of Texas 1822–1897
 Julian S. Garcia, writer of Chicano literature
 Bryan A. Garner (born 1958), lexicographer, grammarian, author, educator
 Van G. Garrett, poet, novelist, teacher, photographer
 Fred Gipson (1908–1973), novelist, author of Old Yeller
 Marcus Goodrich (1897–1991), novelist, screenwriter; married Olivia de Havilland
 John Graves (1920–2013), author
 Jesse Edward Grinstead (1866–1948), author of Western fiction
 Laurie Ann Guerrero, poet

H–M

 Christine Hà (born 1979), writer, poet, editor; chef who won MasterChef cooking competition in 2012
 Hardy Haberman (born 1950), author, filmmaker, educator, figure in BDSM culture
 Elizabeth Forsythe Hailey (born 1938), novelist, journalist, playwright
 Harry H. Halsell (1860–1957), rancher, wrote books about ranching life
 Stephen Harrigan (born 1948), novelist, journalist
 Stanley Hauerwas (born 1940), theologian, philosopher
 Bobbie Louise Hawkins (1930–2018), short story writer, monologist, and poet
 Allison Hedge Coke (born 1958), poet and writer
 Harville Hendrix (born 1935), writer, speaker, therapist
 Patricia Highsmith (1921–1995), novelist, author of Strangers on a Train and The Talented Mr. Ripley
 Rolando Hinojosa-Smith (born 1929), novelist, essayist, poet, educator
 Thomas Elisha Hogg (1842–1880), poet, writer, editor
 Mary Austin Holley (1784–1846), wrote first English-language history of Texas
 Robert E. Howard (1906–1936), author of Conan the Barbarian stories and other pulp adventure tales
 William Humphrey (1924–1997), novelist
 Bret Anthony Johnston (born 1971), author, director of creative writing program at Harvard University
 Mary Karr (born 1955), poet, essayist, memoirist
 Elmer Kelton (1926–2009), journalist, western novelist
 Larry L. King (1929–2012), playwright, journalist, novelist, The Best Little Whorehouse in Texas
 Kevin Kwan (born 1950), novelist
 Joe R. Lansdale (born 1951), author of crime thrillers, Hap and Leonard novels
 Jenny Lawson (born 1973), journalist, humorist, blogger
 Kate Lehrer (born 1939), writer, novelist, reviewer
 Warren Leslie (1927–2011), author, journalist, screenwriter, business executive
 David Liss (born 1966), writer
 Janette Sebring Lowrey (1892–1986), author of children's books, including The Poky Little Puppy
 Max Lucado (born 1955), best-selling Christian author
 Cathy Luchetti (born 1945), author of books about American frontier
 Kirk Lynn (born 1972), playwright, novelist
 Corey Marks (born 1970), poet, educator
 Walt McDonald (1934–2022), poet
 Larry McMurtry (1936–2021), Pulitzer Prize-winning author of Lonesome Dove
 Philipp Meyer (born 1974), novelist
 Vassar Miller (1924–1998), poet
 Michael Moorcock (born 1939), literary and fantasy novelist, musician, journalist
 Frances Mossiker (1906–1985), author of historical novels
 Jack Elliott Myers (1941–2009), poet

N–Z

 Naomi Shihab Nye (born 1952), poet, songwriter, novelist
 Marc Ostrofsky (born 1961), author, entrepreneur, investor
 William A. Owens (1905–1990), author, folklorist, educator
 Greg Pak (born 1968), comic-book writer, film director
 Americo Paredes (1915–1999), author of books on life along U.S.–Mexican border
 Deborah Paredez (born 1970), poet
 David M. Parsons (born 1943), poet, educator, 2011 Texas State Poet Laureate
 Stanley G. Payne (born 1934), historian of modern Spain and European Fascism
 Emmy Pérez, poet
 George Sessions Perry (1910–1956), novelist, correspondent
 Rachel Plummer (1818–1839), wrote a sensational account of her captivity among Comanches
 Julie Powell (1973–2022), author, blogger, subject of film Julie & Julia
 Hugh Prather (1938–2010), writer, minister, counselor
 Deanna Raybourn (born 1968), author of historical fiction and historical mysteries
 James Reasoner (born 1953), writer
 Rick Riordan (born 1964), novelist
 Lexie Dean Robertson (1893–1954), poet
 Lou Halsell Rodenberger (1926–2009), author, educator, journalist
 Jane Gilmore Rushing (1925–1997), novelist, journalist
 Dorothy Scarborough (1878–1935), author, folklorist
 Robert Schenkkan (born 1953), playwright, screenwriter, actor
 Shea Serrano (born 1981), author, journalist
 Cynthia Leitich Smith (born 1967), author of fiction for children and young adults
 Terry Southern (1924–1995), author, screenwriter
 Suzy Spencer (born 1954), true crime author, journalist
 John Steakley (1951–2010), science-fiction and fantasy writer
 Carmen Tafolla (born 1951), poet, writer
 Larry D. Thomas (born 1947), 2008 Texas State Poet Laureate
 Lorenzo Thomas (1944–2005), poet, critic, educator
 Jim Thompson (1906–1977), crime novelist
 Thomas Thompson (1933–1982), author, journalist
 Lon Tinkle (1906–1980), author, Texas historian
 Sergio Troncoso (born 1961), author of The Nature of Truth
 Frederick Turner (born 1943), poet
 John Varley (born 1947), science-fiction writer
 Lizzie Velásquez (born 1989), author, motivational speaker, anti-bullying activist
 Dale L. Walker (1935–2015), writer
 Bryan Washington (born 1993), writer
 Walter Prescott Webb (1888–1963), author, historian
 Marianne Williamson (born 1952), author, social activist, 2020 U.S. presidential candidate
 Janice Woods Windle (born 1938), author of historical novels
 Ruthe Lewin Winegarten (1929–2004), author, editor, historian, social activist
 Kim Wozencraft (born 1954), writer
 Dean Young (1955–2022), poet
 Gwendolyn Zepeda (born 1971), poet, author
 Joaquin Zihuatanejo (Royce Johnson) (born 1971), poet

Journalism
A–D

 Wick Allison (1948–2020), magazine owner and publisher, author
 Alfred O. Andersson (1874–1950), newspaper publisher
 Jim Angle (1946–2022), chief Washington correspondent for Fox News
 Ole Anthony (1938–2021), investigative journalist, magazine editor
 John Ardoin (1935–2001), music critic and author
 Hugh Aynesworth (born 1931), journalist, investigative reporter, authority on the assassination of John F. Kennedy
 Ralph Baker Jr. (1945–2008), radio host
 Cecilia Ballí (born 1976), journalist, anthropologist
 Eddie Barker (1927–2012), television news reporter
 Dave Barnett (born 1958), sportscaster
 Skip Bayless (born 1951), sportswriter
 Michelle Beadle (born 1975), sports reporter for ESPN and NBCUniversal
 Paul Begala (born 1961), Democratic political consultant, political commentator
 Alfred Horatio Belo (1839–1901), newspaper founder
 Joshua Benton (born 1975), newspaper reporter and columnist, educator
 Michael Berry (born 1970), conservative talk-radio host in Houston
 Kevin Blackistone (born 1959), sportswriter
 Bill Blair (1921–2014), newspaper founder and publisher, Negro league baseball player
 Brandon Boyer (born 1977), blog editor
 Pat Boyette (1923–2000), radio journalist, comic book artist
 Billy Lee Brammer (1929–1978), journalist, novelist, political staffer
 William Cowper Brann (1855–1898), journalist, iconoclastic writer
 Marie Brenner (born 1949), investigative journalist, writer
 Joe Bob Briggs (John Bloom) (born 1953), film critic
 Barrett Brown (born 1981), journalist, essayist, satirist, activist; served time in federal prison for facilitating email leaks
 John Henry Brown (1820–1895), historian, newspaper founder and editor, politician
 Lance Brown (born 1972), television sportscaster, NFL football player
 Samantha Brown (born 1970), television host
 Gail Caldwell (born 1951), chief book critic for The Boston Globe
 Liz Carpenter (1920–2010), writer, feminist, reporter, media advisor, speechwriter, political humorist, public relations expert
 Al Carrell (1925–2014), home-improvement columnist, radio host
 Al Carter (born 1952), sports journalist
 Amon G. Carter (1879–1955), newspaper founder and publisher
 Cheryl Casone (born 1970), Fox Business Network anchor
 Elizabeth Chambers (born 1982), television host and news reporter for Current TV
 Craig Cohen (born 1972), broadcast journalist, radio host
 Dan Cook (1926–2008), sportswriter, sportscaster
 Ron Corning (born 1971), television news anchor
 Tim Cowlishaw (born 1955), sportswriter
 Candice Crawford (born 1986), KDAF reporter
 Walter Cronkite (1916–2009), CBS News anchor
 Jim Cummins (1945–2007), NBC News reporter
 Don Dahler (born 1960), journalist, writer, correspondent for CBS News
 Corby Davidson (born 1969), sports radio personality
 Mark Davis (born 1957), conservative talk-show host, newspaper columnist
 Edward Musgrove Dealey (1892–1969), journalist, newspaper publisher
 George B. Dealey (1859–1946), newspaper publisher
 Jody Dean (born 1959), radio journalist, author
 Pete Delkus (born 1965), television meteorologist
 Dayna Devon (born 1970), television journalist
 Sam Donaldson (born 1934), ABC News reporter
 Troy Dungan (born 1936), television meteorologist
 George Dunham (born 1965), radio personality, sportscaster

E–J

 Kurt Eichenwald (born 1961), investigative reporter, author
 Linda Ellerbee (born 1944), journalist, correspondent, reporter
 Gene Elston (1922–2015), sportscaster
 John Henry Faulk (1913–1990), storyteller and radio broadcaster
 T. R. Fehrenbach (1925–2013), newspaper columnist, historian
 Ashley Feinberg (born 1990), journalist, humorist
 Shannon Fife (1888–1972), journalist, humorist, screenwriter
 Robert Flores (born 1970), ESPN Sports anchor
 Ron Franklin (1942–2022), sportscaster
 Kinky Friedman (born 1944), columnist, singer-songwriter, novelist, candidate for governor of Texas
 Randy Galloway (born 1943), radio host, newspaper columnist
 Kyle Gann (born 1955), music critic, composer, musicologist
 George Gimarc (born 1957), radio announcer, disc jockey, producer
 Frank Glieber (1934–1985), sportscaster
 Bianna Golodryga (born 1978), television journalist
 John Howard Griffin (1920–1980), journalist, author
 Oscar Griffin Jr. (1933–2011), newspaper editor, won Pulitzer Prize for uncovering Billie Sol Estes scandal
 Jesse Edward Grinstead (1866–1948), founder of The Kerrville Mountain Sun
 Jenna Bush Hager (born 1981), television news personality, writer
 Leon Hale (1921–2021), journalist, author
 Jane Hall (born 1951), former Fox News pundit, Fox News Watch, The O'Reilly Factor
 Tamron Hall (born 1970), MSNBC daytime anchor
 Grace Halsell (1923–2000), journalist, writer
 Milo Hamilton (1927–2015), sportscaster
 Dale Hansen (born 1948), sportscaster
 Stephen Harrigan (born 1948), journalist, novelist
 Houston Harte (1893–1972), co-founder of Harte-Hanks chain of newspapers
 Christy Haubegger (born 1968), founder of Latina magazine
 Heloise (mother) (1919–1977), syndicated columnist
 Heloise (daughter) (born 1951), syndicated columnist
 Kate Heyhoe (born 1955), food writer
 Dave Hickey (1938–2021), art critic
 Norm Hitzges (born 1944), sportscaster, reporter
 Skip Hollandsworth (born 1957), journalist, screenwriter, magazine editor
 Mark Holtz (1945–1997), sportscaster
 Karen Elliott House (born 1947), journalist, publishing and business executive
 Deborah Howell (1941–2010), newspaper editor
 June Hunt (born 1944), radio host of religious programs
 Jovita Idar (1885–1946), journalist, civil rights activist
 Molly Ivins (1944–2007), political commentator, liberal journalist, and author
 Robert H. Jackson (born 1934), newspaper photographer, won Pulitzer Prize
 Dahr Jamail (born 1968), journalist
 Craig James (born 1961), sports commentator on ABC and ESPN
 Dan Jenkins (1928–2019), sportswriter and author
 Sally Jenkins (born 1960), sports columnist and feature writer for The Washington Post, and author
 Iola Johnson (born 1950), television news anchor, first African-American anchor in the Southwest
 Kenneth P. Johnson (1934–2008), newspaper editor
 Penn Jones Jr. (1914–1998), newspaper journalist, John F. Kennedy assassination conspiracy theorist
 Richard Justice, sportswriter

K–O

 Todd Kalas (born 1965), sportscaster
 Gordon Keith, radio personality
 Steven G. Kellman (born 1947), literary critic, columnist, author, educator
 Hubert Renfro Knickerbocker (1898–1949), journalist, author
 Harry Koch (1867–1942), newspaper founder, railroad founder
 Kidd Kraddick (1959–2013), radio host
 Priya Krishna (born 1991), food writer, YouTube personality
 Aaron Latham (1943–2022), journalist, writer
 Jim Lehrer (1934–2020), television journalist, author
 Michael R. Levy (born 1946), magazine founder and publisher
 Josh Lewin (born 1968), sportscaster
 Marjorie Herrera Lewis (born 1957), sports reporter, author
 Verne Lundquist (born 1940), sportscaster, reporter
 Bill Macatee (born 1955), sportscaster, reporter
 Debra Maffett (born 1956), host of TNN Country News, Miss America 1983
 Dan Malone (born 1955), Pulitzer Prize-winning investigative reporter
 Ernie Manouse (born 1969), television host, radio personality, writer, producer
 Amanda Marcotte (born 1977), feminist/liberal blogger
 Chris Marrou (born 1947), television news anchor
 Roland Martin (born 1968), journalist, syndicated columnist, CNN commentator
 Russ Martin (born 1960), radio host
 Mary Maverick (1818–1898), memoirist
 John McCaa (born 1954), television news anchor
 Kevin McCarthy, radio and television announcer
 Joe McLaughlin (1934–1997), sportswriter
 Gordon McLendon (1921–1986), radio pioneer, innovator, entrepreneur
 Howard McNeil (1920–2010), television meteorologist
 Lisa McRee (born 1961), television journalist
 Sonny Melendrez (born 1946), radio personality, voice actor
 Curt Menefee (born 1965), sportscaster, reporter
 Bill Mercer (born 1926), sportscaster
 Maxine Mesinger (1925–2001), gossip columnist
 Harry J. Middleton (1921–2017), journalist, Presidential speechwriter, educator
 Dale Milford (1926–1997), television meteorologist, U.S. Representative
 Margaret Moser (1954–2017), journalist, music critic
 Leslie Mouton (born 1965), news reporter
 Eric Nadel (born 1951), sportscaster
 James Pearson Newcomb (1837–1907), newspaper journalist, publisher; Secretary of State of Texas
 Chau Nguyen (born 1973), television news anchor
 Jim O'Brien (1939–1983), reporter, disc jockey
 Norah O'Donnell (born 1974), commentator on The Today Show and MSNBC correspondent
 Barbara Olson (1955–2001), Fox News and CNN commentator

P–Z

 Albert Parsons (1848–1887), newspaper editor, socialist, anarchist; was convicted of conspiracy and hanged
 Marjorie Paxson (1923–2017), newspaper journalist, editor, publisher
 Scott Pelley (born 1957), anchor and managing editor of the CBS Evening News
 Uma Pemmaraju (born 1958), anchor for Fox News
 Bob Phillips (born 1951), creator, producer, and host of Texas Country Reporter
 Michael Phillips (born 1960), journalist, historian, author, educator
 Stone Phillips (born 1954), co-anchor of Dateline NBC
 Katherine Anne Porter (1890–1980), journalist, essayist, novelist
 Cactus Pryor (1923–2011), radio personality, actor
 John Quiñones (born 1952), ABC News correspondent
 Dan Rather (born 1931), former CBS Evening News anchor
 Julia Scott Reed (1917–2004), newspaper columnist, reporter, editor
 Rex Reed (born 1938), movie critic
 Dick Risenhoover (1927–1978), sportscaster
 Tracy Rowlett (born 1942), television news anchor
 John Phillip Santos (born 1957), journalist, author, filmmaker, producer
 Bob Schieffer (born 1937), CBS Evening News anchor
 Elliot Segal (born 1969), talk radio host
 Brad Sham (born 1949), sportscaster
 Blackie Sherrod (1919–2016), sportswriter
 Bud Shrake (1931–2009), sportswriter, author
 William Dean Singleton (born 1951), newspaper publishing executive, chairman of the board of Associated Press
 Evan Smith (born 1966), magazine editor, television, radio, internet journalist
 Liz Smith (1923–2017), syndicated columnist
 Mickey Spagnola (born 1952), sportswriter
 Joshua Starnes (born 1976), film critic
 Marc Stein, sports reporter
 Ron Stone (1936–2008), television news reporter
 Linda Stouffer (born 1970), television news anchor
 Clinton Howard Swindle (1945–2004), investigative newspaper journalist, author
 Harold Taft (1922–1991), television meteorologist
 Thomas Thompson (1933–1982), investigative journalist for Life magazine, author
 Emma Tiedemann, sports announcer
 Bascom N. Timmons (1890–1987), opened news bureau in Washington; native of Amarillo
 Jack Tinsley (1935–2004), newspaper executive editor
 Frank X. Tolbert (1912–1984), author, historian, journalist, restaurateur
 Karen Tumulty (born 1955), newspaper correspondent
 Charlie Van Dyke (born 1947), former radio disc jockey of KLIF, known for the best voice of radio and television stations across America; former frequent guest host of American Top 40, 1983–1988
 Rob Walker (born 1968), journalist, author
 Todd Wagner (born 1960), internet broadcasting pioneer
 Robb Walsh, food writer, restaurant owner
 Dave Ward (born 1939), television newscaster
 Greg Williams (born 1960), sports radio host
 Robert Wilonsky (born 1968), newspaper columnist, critic
 Carlo Wolff (born 1943), journalist
 Bill Worrell (born 1947), sportscaster
 Lawrence Wright (born 1947), journalist, author of The Looming Tower
 Robert Wright (born 1957), journalist
 Bobbie Wygant (born 1926), television journalist and host
 Marvin Zindler (1921–2007), television journalist

Science, including medicine
A–K

 Muthu Alagappan (born c. 1990), sports statistician
 James P. Allison (born 1948), immunologist, won Nobel Prize
 Nima Arkani-Hamed (born 1972), theoretical physicist
 Ryan S. Baker (born 1977), computer scientist
 Edmund F. Baroch (1934–2022), metallurgist
 Brady Barr (born 1963), herpetologist
 Charles R. Baxter (1929–2005), emergency-room physician who attended President John F. Kennedy following Kennedy's assassination
 R. Palmer Beasley (1936–2012), physician, public health educator, epidemiologist
 Angela Belcher (born 1967), materials scientist, biological engineer, MIT professor, MacArthur Fellow
 Bruce Beutler (born 1957), Nobel Prize-winning immunologist, geneticist
 James R. Biard (1931–2022), electrical engineer; invented the GaAs infrared light-emitting diode (LED), the optical isolator, the Schottky transistor, and MOS ROM
 Gail Borden (1801–1874), inventor of condensed milk and other foodstuffs, surveyor, publisher
 Edward Boyden (born 1979), neuroscientist, MIT professor
 Otis Boykin (1920–1982), inventor and engineer
 T. Berry Brazelton (1918–2018), pediatrician, author, syndicated columnist
 Michael Glyn Brown (1957–2013), hand surgeon
 Michael Stuart Brown (born 1941), Nobel Prize-winning geneticist
 John Cacioppo (1951–2018), co-founder of social neuroscience
 Robert Cade (1927–2007), physician, scientist; inventor of Gatorade
 William H. Cade (born 1946), zoologist, evolutionary biologist, authority on mating systems of Orthoptera
 Paul C. W. Chu (born 1941), physicist, leading authority on superconductivity
 Denton Cooley (1920–2016), pioneering heart surgeon
 Kenneth H. Cooper (born 1931), physician, developed concept of aerobic exercise
 Marjorie Corcoran (1950–2017), physicist
 Robert Curl (1933–2022), Nobel Prize-winning chemist
 Michael E. DeBakey (1908–2008), pioneering heart surgeon
 Everette Lee DeGolyer (1886–1956), geophysicist, philanthropist
 Robert Dennard (born 1932), computer scientist and inventor
 Bryce DeWitt (1923–2004), physicist, co-developed Wheeler–DeWitt equation ("wave function of the Universe")
 Cécile DeWitt-Morette (1922–2017), physicist, mathematician
 Leonard Eugene Dickson (1874–1954), mathematician
 James "Red" Duke (1928–2015), physician, professor, journalist
 J. Doyne Farmer (born 1952), complex systems scientist, entrepreneur, Oxford mathematics professor
 Ralph Feigin (1938–2008), pediatrician, writer, educator, hospital administrator
 Leroy S. Fletcher (born 1936), mechanical and aerospace engineer
 Alfred G. Gilman (1941–2015), Nobel Prize-winning pharmacologist, biochemist, educator
 Joseph L. Goldstein (born 1940), Nobel Prize-winning geneticist, biochemist
 Cecil Howard Green (1900–2003), geophysicist, founder of Texas Instruments, philanthropist
 Gerald D. Griffin (born 1934), aeronautical engineer, NASA official
 G.B. Halsted (1853–1922), mathematician
 Aubrey Otis Hampton (1900–1955), radiologist
 David Hanson (born 1969), roboticist
 J. William Harbour (born 1963), ophthalmologist, ocular oncologist
 Elise Harmon (1909–1985), physicist, chemist, electronics engineer
 Meredith Hay (born 1962), biomedical researcher
 John Haynes Jr. (born 1937), rural family physician, national recognition as Country Doctor of the Year
 George H. Heilmeier (1936–2014), engineer, contributed to invention of LCDs; was Chief Technical Officer at Texas Instruments
 Helen Hobbs (born 1952), molecular geneticist, physician, professor
 Peter Hotez (born 1958), pediatrician, virologist, educator
 M. King Hubbert (1903–1989), geophysicist
 Lane P. Hughston (born 1951), mathematician, physicist, scholar and professor of mathematical finance
 Nathan Isgur (1947–2001), theoretical physicist
 Ronny Jackson (born 1967), Physician to the President of the United States
 Mildred Fay Jefferson (1927–2010), physician, political activist; first African-American woman to graduate from Harvard Medical School
 Carl Jockusch (born 1941), mathematician
 Mavis Kelsey (1912–2013), physician who founded the Kelsey-Seybold Clinic, professor, writer, philanthropist
 Jack Kilby (1923–2005), Nobel Prize-winning electrical engineer; invented integrated circuit, handheld calculator, thermal printer
 Riki Kobayashi (1924–2013), professor of chemical engineering
 Edwin Jackson Kyle (1876–1963), agriculture expert, professor, ambassador; Kyle Field and Kyle, Texas are named for him

L–Z

 Thelma Patten Law (1900–1968), first African American woman admitted to the Harris County Medical Society
 Ferdinand Lindheimer (1801–1879), botanist
 R. Bowen Loftin (born 1949), physicist, computer scientist, educator, university president
 Cyrus Longworth Lundell (1907–1994), botanist, archaeologist; discovered several Mayan cities in Mexican jungle
 Larry Masinter, computer scientist, internet pioneer
 Henry Cecil McBay (1914–1995), chemist, educator
 Eugene McDermott (1899–1973), geophysicist, founder of Texas Instruments, philanthropist
 Jerry Merryman (1932–2019), electrical engineer, co-invented hand-held calculator
 John S. Meyer (1924–2011), neurologist, medical-school professor and administrator
 C. Wright Mills (1916–1962), prominent political sociologist and author
 Forrest Mims (born 1944), amateur scientist, popular science writer
 Carl Mitcham (born 1941), philosopher of science, professor, writer
 W. E. Moerner (born 1953), chemist, professor
 Oscar Monnig (1902–1999), astronomer and meteoricist
 Robert Lee Moore (1882–1974), mathematician, educator
 Matt Mullenweg (born 1984), developed WordPress software
 Hermann Joseph Muller (1890–1967), Nobel Prize-winning geneticist
 Joseph Nagyvary (born 1934), biochemist, violin maker, Stradivarius researcher
 Leonard L. Northrup Jr. (1918–2016), engineer, inventor, entrepreneur
 Peter Ozsváth (born 1967), mathematician
 Theophilus Painter (1889–1969), zoologist, professor, university president
 Sujal Parikh (1985–2010), global health advocate
 John Park (1814–1872), inventor, construction materials expert, builder
 Percy Pennybacker (1895–1963), civil engineer, innovator of bridge design
 Victor Poor (1933–2012), as Technical Director at Datapoint in San Antonio, led design of the Intel 8008 microprocessor chip
 Ilya Prigogine (1917–2003), Nobel Prize-winning physicist and chemist
 Robert Rohde, physicist
 Harold E. Rohrschach Jr. (1926–1993), physics professor
 Margaret Hutchinson Rousseau (1911–2000), chemical engineer; designed the first commercial penicillin production plant
 Nikos Salingaros (born 1952), mathematician, physicist, architectural theorist, urban theorist
 Donald Seldin (1920–2018), nephrologist, referred to as the "intellectual father of University of Texas Southwestern Medical Center"
 Robert Simpson (1912–2014), meteorologist, hurricane specialist
 Clyde Snow (1928–2014), forensic anthropologist
 John Stapp (1910–1999), Air Force officer, researched human transport and safety
 Michael Starbird (born 1948), mathematician, educator
 E. C. George Sudarshan (1931–2018), physicist, author, University of Texas professor
 John Tate (1925–2019), mathematician, Wolf Prize in Mathematics
 Robert Taylor (1932–2017), Internet pioneer; won National Medal of Technology, Draper Prize
 Gordon Teal (1907–2003), electrical engineer known for developing the first silicon transistor
 Alice Y. Ting (born 1974), chemist, MIT professor
 Beatrice Tinsley (1941–1981), astronomer
 Catalina Trail (born 1949), amateur naturalist, social worker
 Karen Uhlenbeck (born 1942), mathematician, National Medal of Science
 Aureliano Urrutia (1872–1975), physician
 Harry Vandiver (1882–1973), mathematician
 Abraham Verghese (born 1955), physician, educator, author
 Michael Viscardi (born 1989), mathematician
 Hubert Stanley Wall (1902–1971), mathematician, educator
 Steven Weinberg (1933–2021), Nobel Prize-winning physicist
 Spencer Wells (born 1969), geneticist and anthropologist
 Fred Wendorf (1924–2015), anthropologist
 John A. Wheeler (1911–2008), physicist, Wolf Prize in Physics, coined the term 'black hole'
 Mary Wheeler (born 1938), mathematician
 Quentin Wilson (born 1942), engineer, one of the "Rocket Boys" portrayed in a 1990s book and film
 Robert Woodrow Wilson (born 1936), Nobel Prize-winning physicist, astronomer
 Lloyd Youngblood (born 1946), neurosurgeon

Aviation and space exploration

 John Aaron (born 1943), NASA engineer, flight controller
 William Anders (born 1933), Apollo program astronaut
 Anousheh Ansari (born 1966 in Mashhad, Iran), first female space tourist
 Jeffrey Ashby (born 1954), astronaut
 Alan Bean (1932–2018), astronaut
 John E. Blaha (born 1942), astronaut
 David Harold Byrd (1900–1986), founder of Civil Air Patrol, oilman
 Eugene Cernan (1934–2017), astronaut, walked on moon; lived most of his life in Texas
 Kenneth Cockrell (born 1950), astronaut
 Aaron Cohen (1931–2010), director of NASA's Lyndon B. Johnson Space Center
 Bessie "Queen Bess" Coleman (1892–1926), first African American female aviator
 Douglas "Wrong Way" Corrigan (1907–1995), aviator
 John Oliver Creighton (born 1943), astronaut
 Robert Crippen (born 1937), astronaut
 John M. Fabian (born 1939), astronaut
 William Frederick Fisher (born 1946), astronaut
 Patrick G. Forrester (born 1957), astronaut
 Benjamin Foulois (1879–1967), pioneering military aviator
 Edward Givens (1930–1967), astronaut
 Gerald D. Griffin (born 1934), director of Johnson Space Center, aeronautical engineer
 Bernard A. Harris Jr. (born 1956), astronaut
 Al Haynes (1931–2019), airline pilot, saved numerous lives in 1989 crash landing of crippled DC-10
 Gary L. Herod (1929–1961), Texas Air National Guard pilot who stayed with his plane as it crashed, to avoid residential areas
 Paul Hill (born 1962), Director of Mission Operations at NASA's Lyndon B. Johnson Space Center
 Donald Holmquest (born 1939), astronaut
 Howard Hughes (1905–1976), billionaire playboy, entrepreneur and aviation pioneer
 Millie Hughes-Fulford (1945–2021), astronaut
 Rick Husband (1957–2003), commander of the Space Shuttle Columbia, killed in its crash
 Robert S. Kimbrough (born 1967), astronaut
 Timothy Kopra (born 1963), astronaut
 Paul Lockhart (born 1956), astronaut
 Ormer Locklear (1891–1920), stunt flyer
 Edgar Mitchell (1930–2016), astronaut
 Richard Mullane (born 1945), astronaut
 Arthur W. Murray (1918–2011), test pilot
 John D. Olivas (born 1965), NASA astronaut of Mexican descent, flew aboard the Space Shuttle Atlantis (STS-117) in June 2007
 Wiley Post (1898–1935), first pilot to fly solo around the world
 James F. Reilly (born 1954), astronaut
 David Scott (born 1932), astronaut
 Elliot See (1927–1966), astronaut
 Katherine Stinson (1891–1977), pioneering female aviator
 Chesley "Sully" Sullenberger (born 1951), airline pilot, safely landed US Airways Flight 1549 on the Hudson River after a bird strike
 Ed Swearingen (1925–2014), aeronautical engineer
 Jerri Sloan Truhill (1929–2013), aviator, member of Mercury 13
 Shannon Walker (born 1965), astronaut, physicist
 Azellia White (1913–2019), first African-American woman to earn a pilot's license in Texas
 Ed White (1930–1967), first American astronaut to walk in space
 Jeana Yeager (born 1952), broke distance records during nonstop flight around the world in the experimental Voyager airplane

Scholars, educators, academicians
See also the listings on this page for individual areas of specialization (e.g., Literature, Science/medicine, Music)
A–K

 R. J. Q. Adams (born 1943), professor of British history at Texas A&M University
 Theodore Albrecht (born 1945), music historian, educator
 L.C. (Laurine Cecil) Anderson (1853–1938), African-American educator
 Cecilia Ballí (born 1976), anthropologist, professor, journalist
 Jacques Barzun (1907–2012), historian, philosopher, recipient of Presidential Medal of Freedom
 ZerNona Black (1906–2005), civil rights activist, educator
 H. W. Brands (born 1953), historian, author, professor at University of Texas
 Brené Brown (born 1965), scholar, researcher, and University of Houston professor of social work
 Kate Moore Brown (1871–1945), first public-school music teacher in Texas, helped form several arts organizations
 Robert A. Brown (born 1951), president of Boston University, chemical engineer
 Walter L. Buenger (born 1951), historian
 Robert D. Bullard (born 1946), professor, university administrator
 Rufus Columbus Burleson (1823–1901), president of Baylor University, minister
 Norma V. Cantu (born 1954), civil rights lawyer, educator
 Marcia Citron (born 1945), musicologist, professor
 Christine Comer (born 1950), Director of Science in the curriculum division of the Texas Education Agency; resigned amid controversy
 Louise Cowan (1916–2015), liberal arts scholar, professor, critic
 Jennifer Cowley (born 1974), urban planner, president of University of Texas at Arlington
 Light Townsend Cummins (born 1946), historian, educator
 Adina Emilia De Zavala (1861–1955), teacher, historian, Texas history preservationist
 Ramón H. Dovalina (born 1943), president of Laredo Community College, 1995–2007
 T. R. Fehrenbach (1925–2013), historian, newspaper columnist
 Peter T. Flawn (1926–2017), president of University of Texas at Austin
 Dan Flores (born 1948), historian of the American West
 Joe Bertram Frantz (1917–1993), historian
 Julia Caldwell Frazier (1863–1929), educator
 Thomas Freeman (1919–2020), debate coach
 W. C. Friley (1845–1911), first president of Hardin–Simmons University, 1892–1894
 Marilyn Gambrell (born 1953), parole officer turned teacher who started the program No More Victims in Houston to assist children with incarcerated parents
 Kyle Gann (born 1955), musicologist, composer, music critic
 Juliet V. García, university president, was awarded Presidential Medal of Freedom
 Bryan A. Garner (born 1958), lexicographer, grammarian, author, educator
 Anna Harriet Heyer (1909–2002), musicologist, music librarian, bibliographer
 Harold Hoehner (1935–2009), theologian, author, professor
 Roy Hofheinz Jr. (born 1935), sinologist, professor at Harvard University
 William Curry Holden (1896–1993), historian, archaeologist, educator, museum director
 John Holmes Jenkins (1940–1989), historian, antiquarian bookseller, publisher, poker player
 Bret Anthony Johnston (born 1971), author, director of creative writing program at Harvard University
 Shirley Strum Kenny (born 1934), English scholar, university president
 V. O. Key Jr. (1908–1963), political scientist, Ivy League professor
 Lucy Ann Kidd-Key (1839–1916), educator, college administrator
 Wendy Kopp (born 1967), founder and president of Teach For America
 Arnold Krammer (1941–2018), historian of Germany and the United States; retired professor at Texas A&M University

L–Z

 Umphrey Lee (1893–1958), Methodist pastor, president of Southern Methodist University
 Charles LeMaistre (1924–2017), physician, chancellor of University of Texas System
 Alan Lomax (1915–2002), folk singer, guitarist, ethnomusicologist, folklorist
 John Lomax (1867–1948), musicologist, folklorist
 Edgar Odell Lovett (1871–1957), educator, college administrator, first president of Rice University
 Juan L. Maldonado (1948–2018), president of Laredo Community College since 2007
 Charles R. Matthews (born 1939), former Texas Railroad Commissioner and chancellor-emeritus of the Texas State University System
 Mack McCormick (1930–2015), musicologist, folklorist
 Robert D. McTeer (born c. 1943), economist, president of the Federal Reserve Bank of Dallas
 Francis Joseph Mullin (1906–1997), president of Shimer College
 Barry Munitz (born 1941), corporation and foundation executive, chancellor of University of Houston System and California State University System
 Gene Nichol (born 1951), president of the College of William & Mary
 Leonidas Warren Payne Jr. (1873–1945), linguist, folklorist, English professor
 Shanna Peeples (born 1965) National Teacher of the Year, 2015; scholar, author
 Anna Pennybacker (1861–1938), educator, author, social activist
 Ben H. Procter (1927–2012), historian at Texas Christian University in Fort Worth, 1957–2000
 Lawrence Sullivan "Sul" Ross (1838–1898), Confederate general, Governor of Texas, President of Texas A&M University, namesake of Sul Ross State University
 John Silber (1926–2012), president and chancellor of Boston University
 Ruth J. Simmons (born 1945), first female African-American president of a major college (Smith College), first African-American president of an Ivy League college (Brown University)
 Thomas Vernor Smith (1890–1964), philosopher, scholar, educator, U.S. representative
 Jerry D. Thompson (born 1943), historian of Texas and the Southwestern United States
 Leon Toubin (born 1928), Jewish civic leader, philanthropist, and historian
 Decherd Turner (1922–2002), bibliophile, book collector, librarian, minister
 Clara Belle Williams (1885–1993), educator
 Sudie L. Williams (1872–1940), music educator
 Roger L. Worsley (born 1937), president of Laredo Community College, 1985–1995
 Susan Youens (born 1947), musicologist, music professor, author
 Mark Yudof (born 1944), law professor, university chancellor

Religion and clergy
A–M

 Charles L. Allen (1913–2005), Methodist minister
 Kathleen Baskin-Ball (1958–2008), Methodist
 Gregory Beale (born 1949), biblical scholar
 Norman A. Beck (born 1933), Lutheran pastor, professor
 Mary C. Billings (1824–1904), Universalist
 Claude Black (1916–2009), Baptist
 Edmond L. Browning (1929–2016), Episcopal bishop
 C. L. Bryant (born 1956), Baptist minister, Conservative media personality
 Kirbyjon Caldwell (born 1953), Methodist
 Benajah Harvey Carroll (1843–1914), Baptist
 Henry Cohen (1863–1952), Jewish
 Kenneth Copeland (born 1936), Pentecostal
 W. A. Criswell (1909–2002), Baptist
 Finis Alonzo Crutchfield Jr. (1911–1987), Methodist Bishop
 Rafael Cruz (born 1939), Cuban-born preacher, and father of Texas Senator Ted Cruz (moved to Texas from Calgary, Alberta, Canada)
 John B. Denton (1806–1841), Methodist minister for whom Denton (and Denton County) in Texas are named
 Matt Dillahunty (born 1969), atheist philosopher, media host
 James T. Draper Jr. (born 1935), Baptist
 Claude Marie Dubuis (1817–1895), Catholic bishop
 Michael Duca (born 1952), Roman Catholic bishop
 Yusuf Estes (born 1944), Islamic scholar (moved to Texas from Ohio)
 Kevin Farrell (born 1947), Roman Catholic bishop
 Patrick Flores (1929–2017), Catholic archbishop
 George Foreman (born 1949), Christian ordained minister, world heavyweight champion boxer, entrepreneur
 Charles Victor Grahmann (1931–2018), Catholic bishop
 Ruben Habito (born 1947), Zen master, former Jesuit priest
 John Hagee (born 1940), nondenominational
 Kenneth E. Hagin (1917–2003), Pentecostal
 Homer Hailey (1903–2000), Church of Christ
 J. H. Hamblen (1877–1971), Methodist bishop
 John Wesley Hardt (1921–2017), Methodist
 Samuel Augustus Hayden (1839–1918), Baptist pastor, newspaper publisher
 Steve Hill (1954–2014), evangelist
 Victor Houteff (1885–1955), founder of Davidian Seventh-day Adventist organization
 V. E. Howard (1911–2000), Church of Christ; started radio International Gospel Hour in Texarkana
 Jack Hyles (1926–2001), Baptist
 T. D. Jakes (born 1957), nondenominational pastor, entrepreneur, author
 Robert Jeffress (born 1955), pastor since 2007 of the First Baptist Church of Dallas
 James S. Johnston (1843–1924), Episcopal bishop, educator
 Jerry Johnston (born 1959), Baptist
 Jimmy Kessler (born 1945), Jewish
 John Kilian (1811–1884), Lutheran
 Abraham Cohen Labatt (1802–1899), Jewish
 Umphrey Lee (1893–1958), Methodist pastor, president of Southern Methodist University
 David Lefkowitz (1875–1955), Jewish
 G. Craige Lewis (born 1969), Presbyterian
 Max Lucado (born 1955), Church of Christ
 Texe Marrs (1944–2019), ran Christian ministries, writer on religious themes
 J. Vernon McGee (1904–1988), Presbyterian
 Charles R. Moore (1934–2014), Methodist minister, social activist, self-immolated

N–Z

 Bonnie Nettles (1927–1985), co-founded a religious group that would later become the Heaven's Gate cult
 J. Frank Norris (1877–1952), Baptist
 Grady Nutt (1934–1982), Baptist minister, humorist
 Jean-Marie Odin (1800–1870), Catholic bishop
 Levi Olan (1903–1984), Jewish
 Joel Osteen (born 1963), nondenominational
 John Osteen (1925–1999), nondenominational
 Albert Outler (1908–1989), Methodist theologian
 Daniel Parker (1781–1844), Primitive Baptist, Two-Seed-in-the-Spirit Predestinarian Baptist
 Paige Patterson (born 1942), Baptist
 William Evander Penn (1832–1895), Baptist evangelist
 Doug Phillips (born 1965), Christian author, speaker, attorney, homeschooling advocate 
 Paul Powell (1933–2016), Baptist minister, educator
 Aron Ra (born 1962), atheist activist, politician
 John R. Rice (1895–1980), Baptist
 James Robison (born 1943), nondenominational
 Benjamin Roden (1902–1978), prime organizer of Branch Davidian Seventh-day Adventist Association
 Lois Roden (1916–1986), president of Branch Davidian Seventh-day Adventist Church
 Lester Roloff (1914–1982), Independent Baptist
 Dmitri Royster (1923–2011), archbishop of Orthodox Church in America
 Hyman Judah Schachtel (1907–1990), Jewish
 R. W. Schambach (1926–2012), Christian televangelist based in Tyler
 Priscilla Shirer (born 1974), Christian speaker, author
 William Angie Smith (1894–1974), Methodist bishop
 Joseph P. Sneed (1804–1881), Methodist Episcopal minister, educator, great-great-great-grandfather of Carly Fiorina
 Samuel M. Stahl (born 1939), Jewish
 David E. Stern (born 1961), Jewish
 Chuck Swindoll (born 1934), Evangelical
 James Anthony Tamayo (born 1949), Roman Catholic
 Robert Tilton (born 1946), Christian televangelist
 George Washington Truett (1867–1944), Baptist
 Cecil Williams (born 1929), Methodist minister, community leader, author, lecturer, spokesperson for the poor
 Kenneth W. Wright (born 1945), Church of Christ
 John Yanta (1931–2022), Roman Catholic bishop
 Jack Yates (1828–1897), Baptist pastor, black community leader, former slave

Supercentenarians (longevity)

 Isaac Brock (c. 1800?–1909), supercentenarian
 Arbella Ewing (1894–2008), at her death was the third oldest person in the world
 Thomas Nelson Sr. (1895–2007), at his death was the oldest man in the United States and the second oldest man in the world
 Richard Arvin Overton (1906–2018), at his death was the oldest man in the United States
 Margaret Skeete (1878–1994), oldest person ever from Texas

Infamous Texans
A–M

 Charles Albright (1933–2020), Dallas area serial killer
 Marshall Applewhite (1931–1997), organized Heaven's Gate cult and led its members in a mass suicide 
 Joe Ball (1892–1938), serial killer
 Buck Barrow (1903–1933), member of Bonnie and Clyde's gang, brother of Clyde Barrow
 Sam Bass (1851–1878), train robber and western icon
 John Battaglia (1955–2018), murdered his two young daughters
 Benny Binion (1904–1989), crime boss; later a Las Vegas casino owner
 Bonnie and Clyde (Bonnie Parker [1910–1934] and Clyde Barrow [1909–1934]), bank robbers and murderers
 David Owen Brooks (1955–2020), Houston serial killer, early 1970s
 Barrett Brown (born 1981), journalist, essayist, satirist, activist; serving time in federal prison for facilitating email leaks
 Marilyn Buck (1947–2010), accomplice in both the 1979 prison break of black activist Assata Shakur and the 1981 Brink's robbery
 William Carver (1868–1901), member of Butch Cassidy's gang
 Jamiel Chagra (1944–2008), drug trafficker
 Mark David Chapman (born 1955), murdered former Beatle John Lennon
 Billy Chemirmir (born 1972), serial killer
 Joseph Civello (1902–1970), Dallas crime boss
 Dean Corll (1939–1973), serial killer
 Ethan Couch (born 1997), following a conviction for multiple counts of intoxication manslaughter was given probation based on affluenza defense
 J. Frank Dalton (1848–1951), claimed to be the outlaw Jesse James
 T. Cullen Davis (born 1933), heir to oil fortune, arrested for murder and solicitation; acquitted of criminal charges but held responsible in wrongful death lawsuit
 William George Davis (born 1984), serial killer
 Lottie Deno (Carlotta Thompkins) (1844–1934), gambler
 Christopher Duntsch (born 1971), neurosurgeon imprisoned for gross malpractice
 Russell Erxleben (born 1957), former NFL kicker, convicted of securities fraud
 Billie Sol Estes (1925–2013), businessman convicted of fraud
 King Fisher (1853–1884), gunslinger, outlaw
 Ralph Fults (1911–1993), outlaw, associated with Bonnie and Clyde
 Raymond Hamilton (1913–1935), member of Bonnie and Clyde's gang; executed
 John Wesley Hardin (1853–1895), outlaw and gun-fighter, reputed to be "the meanest man alive"
 Charles Harrelson (1938–2007), hitman
 Elmer Wayne Henley (born 1956), Houston serial killer, early 1970s
 John Hinckley Jr. (born 1955), attempted to assassinate President Reagan
 Arnoldo Jimenez (born 1982), uxoricide and FBI most wanted fugitive
 Micah Xavier Johnson (c. 1991 – 2016), ambushed and killed multiple Dallas police officers
 Genene Jones (born 1950), pediatric nurse who killed multiple patients
 W. D. Jones (1916–1974), member of Bonnie and Clyde's gang
 David Koresh (1959–1993), self-proclaimed messiah and head of Branch Davidian cult
 Colleen LaRose (born 1963), "Jihad Jane", charged with multiple terrorist-related crimes
 Rosario (1887–1954) and Sam (1894–1951) Maceo, brothers, organized-crime bosses in Galveston
 Robert Jay Mathews (1953–1984), neo-Nazi white supremacist
 Linda Medlar (born 1949), involved in sex scandal with politician Henry Cisneros; later convicted for bank fraud
 Della Moore (c. 1880 – c. 1926), prostitute, girlfriend of outlaw Harvey Logan ("Kid Curry")

N–Z

 Johnny Jack Nounes (1890–1970), organized-crime boss in Galveston
 Ronald Clark O'Bryan (1944–1984), murdered his son with poisoned Halloween candy; executed
 Tom O'Folliard (1858–1880), outlaw and Billy the Kid's best friend
 Lee Harvey Oswald (1939–1963), assassin of U.S. President John F. Kennedy
 Christine Paolilla (born 1986), murdered four people
 Kenneth Parnell (1931–2008), sex offender, kidnapper of seven-year-old Steven Stayner
 Albert T. Patrick (1866–1940), lawyer convicted of the murder of businessman and philanthropist William Marsh Rice, his client 
 Etta Place (c. 1878 – 19??), companion of outlaw Harry Longabaugh, the "Sundance Kid"
 Jonathan Pollard (born 1954), intelligence analyst convicted of espionage
 Fannie Porter (1873 – c. 1940), prostitute, madam, associated with several outlaws
 Ollie Quinn (1893–1949), mobster, gang leader in Galveston
 Richard Ramirez (1960–2013), serial killer
 Paul Dennis Reid (1957–2013), serial killer
 Ollie P. Roberts (c. 1879 – 1950), claimed to be Billy the Kid
 Charles Rogers (1921–1975), murder suspect, disappeared mysteriously, declared dead in absentia
 "Freeway" Rick Ross (born 1960), convicted drug trafficker
 J. L. Hunter "Red" Rountree (1911–2004), bank robber
 Darlie Routier (born 1970), convicted of murdering young son; verdict has been challenged
 Jack Ruby (1910–1967), killed Lee Harvey Oswald following the assassination of President John F. Kennedy
 Yolanda Saldívar (born 1960), convicted for the murder of pop singer Selena
 Mark Salling (1982–2018), actor, convicted on charges of possession of child pornography
 Jon Schillaci (born 1971), former FBI Ten Most Wanted Fugitive
 Dena Schlosser (born 1969), murdered her 11-month-old daughter
 Bobby Seale (born 1936), co-founder of the Black Panthers
 Servant Girl Annihilator (fl. 1885), unidentified serial killer from Austin
 Henry Smith (1876–1893), murdered a child; he was lynched
 Soapy Smith (1860–1898), infamous confidence man of Round Rock and Fort Worth
 Richard B. Spencer (born 1978), white supremacist
 Allen Stanford (born 1950), financier convicted of operating a Ponzi scheme and fraud
 Belle Starr (1848–1889), the Wild West's "bandit queen"
 D. C. Stephenson (1891–1966), murderer, rapist, Grand Dragon of the Indiana Ku Klux Klan
 Peggy Jo Tallas (1944–2005), bank robber
 Texas Seven, group of prison escapees who caused a national manhunt after a crime spree in December 2000, apprehended in January 2001 due to America's Most Wanted
 Libby Thompson (1855–1953), dancehall girl, prostitute, and brothel owner better known as Squirrel-tooth Alice
 Bernie Tiede (born 1958), convicted murderer, subject of the 2011 film Bernie
 Catalina Vasquez Villalpando (born 1940), Treasurer of the United States, convicted of tax evasion and obstruction of justice
 Edgar Valdez Villarreal (born 1973), "La Barbie", drug trafficker
 Dutch Voight (1888–1986), gang leader in Galveston
 Tex Watson (born 1945), convicted murderer, former member of the Charles Manson "Family"
 Cameron Todd Willingham (1968–2004), convicted and executed for the murder of his children; verdict has been challenged
 Susan Wright (born 1976), convicted murderer
 Andrea Yates (born 1964), drowned her five children in the bathtub of her house
 Diane Zamora (born 1978), convicted, along with her boyfriend, David Graham, in notorious "cadet murder" case

Others

A–M

 Bobo Barnett (1903–1985), circus clown
 Carole Baskin (born 1961), animal rights activist, featured on the Netflix series Tiger King
 Lee Bowers (1925–1966), witness to the assassination of John F. Kennedy
 Joe Bowman (1925–2009), bootmaker and marksman and guardian of Old West culture
 Clarence Brandley (1951–2018), exonerated after serving nine years on death row for a murder and rape he did not commit
 Ben Breedlove (1993–2011), Internet personality
 Frank Buck (1884–1950), hunter, animal collector, author (Bring 'Em Back Alive), actor, director, producer
 Buffalo Hump (c. 1800 – c. 1867), Comanche Chief
 Barbara Bush (born 1981), healthcare activist
 Chukwu octuplets: Ebuka, Chidi, Echerem, Chima, Ikem, Jioke, Gorom (all born 1998), and Odera (1998–1998), first recorded live-born set of octuplets in U.S.
 Leslie Cochran (1951–2012), peace activist, cross-dresser, urban outdoorsman
 Carol Cole (1963–1980), murder victim whose body was unidentified for 34 years
 Crazy Ray (Wilford Jones) (1931–2007), Dallas Cowboys mascot
 Mark Crutcher (born 1948), anti-abortion activist, author, and founder of Life Dynamics Inc.
 George de Mohrenschildt (1911–1977), petroleum geologist, friend of Lee Harvey Oswald, gave testimony to the Warren Commission
 Billie Ert (c. 1942 – 1976), member of first same-sex couple to be married in Texas
 Lauren Grandcolas (1963–2001), one of the passengers on United Airlines Flight 93 on 9/11
 Anthony Charles Graves (born 1965), exonerated after serving 18 years in prison, including 12 on death row, for a series of murders he did not commit
 Amber Hagerman (1986–1996), victim of abduction/murder, namesake of AMBER Alert
 Lawrence Herkimer (1925–2015), cheerleading innovator
 Jean Hill (1931–2000), witness to the assassination of John F. Kennedy
 Joan Robinson Hill (1931–1969), socialite, equestrian, murder victim; events surrounding her death were the subject of a book by Thomas Thompson and a film, Murder in Texas
 Bose Ikard (1840s?–1929), cowboy, cattle driver, former slave
 Brandon Lawson (1987 – disappeared 2013), disappeared mysteriously
 Ben H. Love (1930–2010), Scouting executive
 Stacie Madison (1970 – disappeared 1988), disappeared mysteriously
 John McClamrock (1956–2008), whose life as a quadraplegic following a football injury was profiled by journalist Skip Hollandsworth in an award-winning story
 Jessica McClure (born 1986), "Baby Jessica", rescued after falling into a well
 Norma McCorvey (1947–2017), as "Jane Roe", was the plaintiff in the 1973 landmark U.S. Supreme Court case Roe v. Wade
 Ahmed Mohamed (born 2001), arrested at MacArthur High School in Irving, for bringing a reassembled clock to school, which a teacher thought looked like a bomb; police determined that Mohamed had no malicious intent
 Antonio Molina (c. 1939 – 1991), member of first same-sex couple to be married in Texas
 Mary Moorman (born 1932), witness to the assassination of John F. Kennedy
 Michael Morton (born 1954), exonerated after serving 25 years in prison for a murder he did not commit
 Julie Ann Moseley (1965 – disappeared 1974), disappeared mysteriously
 Khalid Abdul Muhammad (1948–2001), black American activist
 Mukwooru (1770s–1840), Comanche chief

N–Z

 Orville Nix (1911–1972), filmed assassination of John F. Kennedy
 Donna Norris (born 1967), child safety campaigner, mother of Amber Hagerman
 Michael Paine (1928–2018), acquaintance of Lee Harvey Oswald
 Ruth Paine (born 1932), friend of Marina Oswald
 Lucy Parsons (c. 1853 – 1942), labor organizer, radical socialist, anarchist communist, orator
 Olga Rodriguez (born c. 1947), Chicano activist, has represented U. S. Socialist Workers Party
 Santos Rodriguez (1960–1973), 12-year-old murdered by a law-enforcement officer while in police custody
 Charlotte Mailliard Shultz (1933–2021), Chief of Protocol of State of California and City and County of San Francisco, Trustee San Francisco War Memorial and Performing Arts Center, widow of former Secretary of State George P. Shultz
 Karen Silkwood (1948–1974), nuclear plant worker, labor activist, died under mysterious circumstances; subject of a major motion picture
 Marilyn Sitzman (1939–1993), witness to the assassination of John F. Kennedy
 Susan Smalley (1969 – disappeared 1988), disappeared mysteriously
 Swante M. Swenson (1816–1896), founder of SMS ranches
 James Tague (1936–2014), witness to the assassination of John F. Kennedy who sustained minor injuries during the shooting
 Bob Tallman (born 1947), rodeo announcer
 J. L. Tarr (1919–2008), Scouting executive
 Doris Tate (1924–1992), advocate for crime victims' rights, mother of Sharon Tate
 Emma Tenayuca (1916–1999), labor leader, union organizer
 Michael Roy Toney (1965–2009), served ten years on death row after being wrongly convicted for a deadly bombing
 Armando Torres III (1987 – disappeared 2013), kidnapped in Mexico
 Rachel Trlica (1957 – disappeared 1974), disappeared mysteriously
 Willie Velasquez (1944–1988), social activist
 Richard Viguerie (born 1933), conservative figure, pioneer of political direct mail and writer on American politics
 James Larkin "Jim" White (1882–1946), cave explorer, cowboy, miner, park ranger, discovered Carlsbad Caverns
 Dallas Wiens (born 1985), first U.S. recipient of a full face transplant
 Roy Williams (born 1944), Scouting executive
 Kelly Dae Wilson (1974 – disappeared 1992), disappeared mysteriously
 Renee Wilson (1960 – disappeared 1974), disappeared mysteriously
 Plennie L. Wingo (1895–1993), world record for longest distance walked backwards (from Santa Monica, California, to Istanbul, Turkey)
 Ron Woodroof (1950–1992), HIV/AIDS victim who created the Dallas Buyers Club to acquire and distribute AIDS drugs; subject of a major motion picture
 Quanell X (born 1970), leader of New Black Panther Party in Houston
 Yellow Wolf (c. 1800 – 1854), Comanche chief
 Abraham Zapruder (1905–1970), clothing manufacturer, filmed assassination of John F. Kennedy in Dallas in 1963

See also

 :Category:Lists of people from Texas

References

Lists of people from Texas